= Divine Mercy in Song =

Divine Mercy in Song is a project of Trish Short, founder of the nonprofit organization Artists for Life. After composing a contemporary version of the Divine Mercy prayer, her song became widely used for this rosary prayer.

== History ==
The Divine Mercy image. In English, "Jesús en Vos confío" means "Jesus I trust in You".

After Trish Short founded the nonprofit group Artists for Life in 2000, the National Shrine of The Divine Mercy located in Stockbridge, Massachusetts, commissioned her to compose a Contemporary Christian song based on the Divine Mercy Chaplet in 2002. Based on a prayer from Diary: Divine Mercy in My Soul by St. Maria Faustina Kowalska, Short produced the CD and sings one of three lead vocalist parts, with Michael Bethea and Crystal Yates.

The Marians of the Immaculate Conception and the Eucharistic Apostles of The Divine Mercy helped Short produce a video filmed at the National Shrine of The Divine Mercy in 2002.The Chaplet of Divine Mercy in Song has been heard on EWTN Global Catholic Network. Short said she believed she had fallen "beyond the reach of God's mercy" until a friend told her about the message of Divine Mercy.

A Spanish version of Short's Rosary-based prayer, La Coronilla de La Divina Misericordia, Cantada (The Chaplet of the Divine Mercy, Sung) and Generations Unite in Prayer: The Divine Mercy Chaplet in Song are other productions from Divine Mercy in Song.

== See also ==
- Divine Mercy Sunday
