= Shrine of Divine Mercy, Vilnius =

Shrine in Vilnius

Coordinates: 54°40′53″N 25°17′08″E

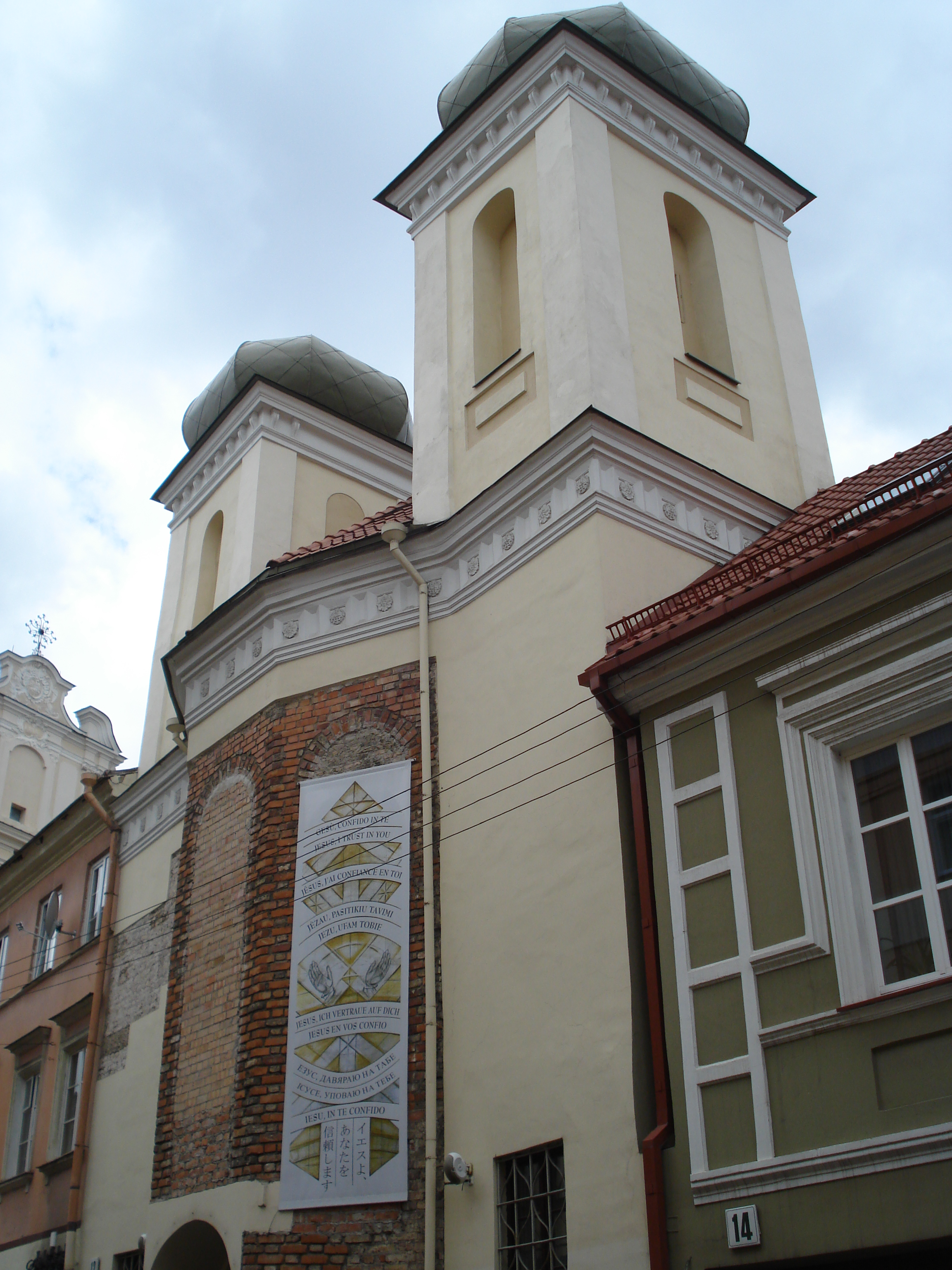
The façade

The Shrine of Divine Mercy or the Holy Trinity Church (Lithuanian: Vilniaus Dievo Gailestingumo šventovė) is a shrine in Vilnius dedicated to the Divine Mercy, a devotion originated by Faustina Kowalska.

== History ==
On the site of the present church (Dominikonų St. 12) a Gothic single-nave church was built in the 15th century and named Holy Trinity Church. It was reconstructed after the 1748 and 1749 fires: a new presbytery and two towers were built on, and in a place of a Gothic apse a new portal was erected. The church belonged to the university; one of its deans was the university rector, Jesuit astronomer Marcin Odlanicki Poczobutt.

The tsarist authorities converted it into a Russian Orthodox church in 1821, but in 1920 it was returned to the Catholics. In Soviet times the church was abandoned.

On Divine Mercy Sunday, 18 April 2004 under the care of Cardinal Audrys Bačkis, the church was restored, blessed, and given the title Shrine of the Divine Mercy. The church was adapted for the display of the original Image of Merciful Jesus, painted according to the vision of Saint Faustina Kowalska by artist Eugeniusz Kazimirowski in 1934. The Shrine is also decorated with two sgraffiti made by Nijolė Vilutytė: the Virgin of Mercy of the Gate of Dawn and the prayer Jesus I trust in you in eleven languages.

== Image of Divine Mercy ==
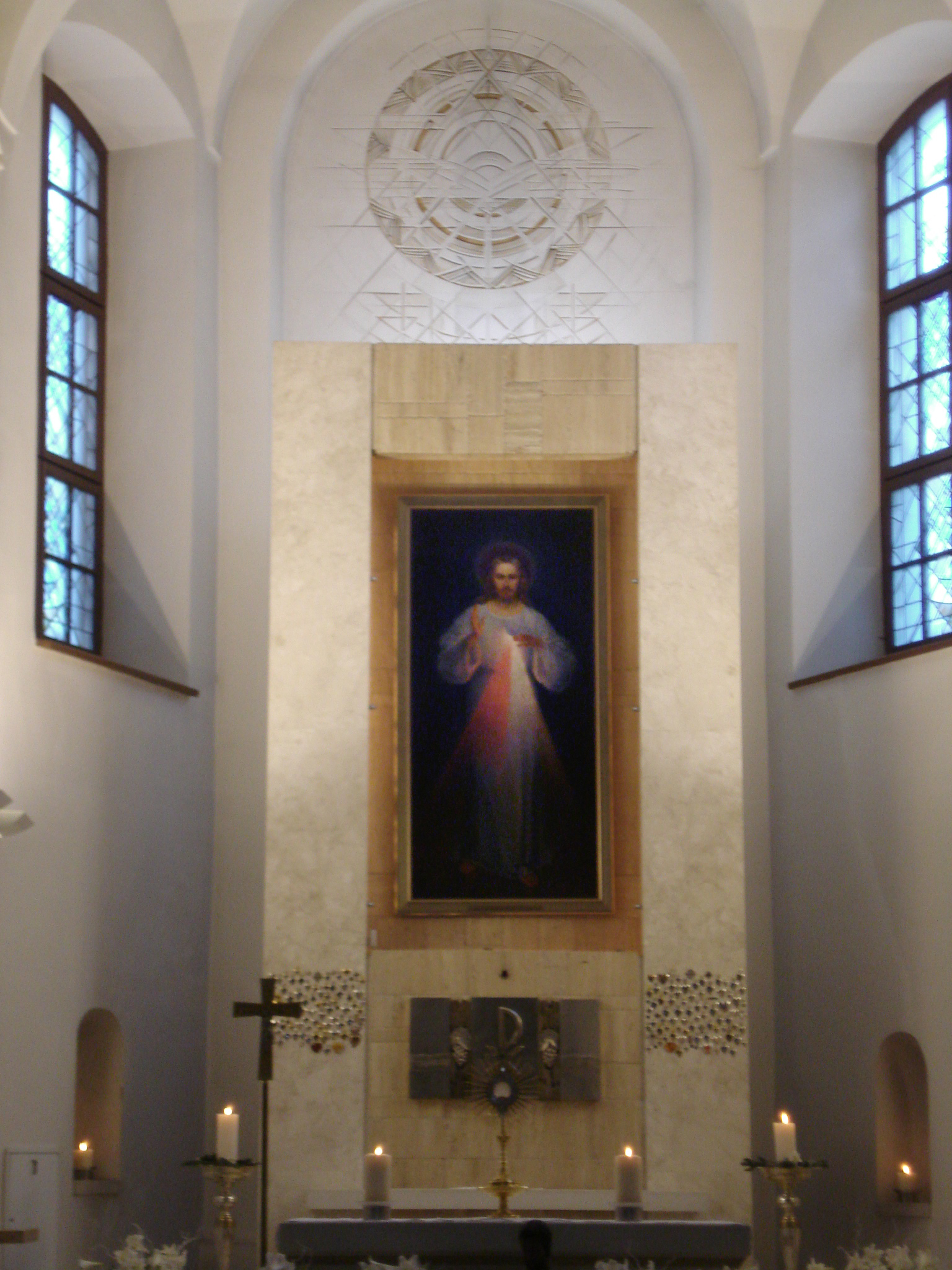
The original Divine Mercy image by Eugeniusz Kazimirowski

In his painting, Eugeniusz Kazimirowski depicted Jesus in the way Sister Faustina saw him in her visions. His right hand lifted to bless and two rays (symbolizing life and forgiveness) coming out of his heart. After the Image of Merciful Jesus was completed in June 1934, it was kept in the corridor of the convent of the Bernardine Sisters beside the Church of St. Michael were Blessed Michał Sopoćko was rector. Jesus, in one of Faustina's visions, had expressed to her his wish that the image be put in a place of honor, above the main altar of the church. Fittingly, the first place that the Image of Merciful Jesus was publicly venerated was at a chapel dedicated to the Virgin of Mercy, the Gate of Dawn. In April 1935, for three days leading up to the first Sunday after Easter, the image was honored by crowds of faithful people. This occasion also marked the closing of the Jubilee Year of the Redemption of the World, as it had been nineteen hundred years since the Passion, death, and resurrection of Jesus. In 1937, on the first Sunday after Easter – now Divine Mercy Sunday – the image was hung in the Church of St. Michael, Vilnius next to the main altar.

== See also ==
- Saint Faustina Kowalska
- Chaplet of the Divine Mercy
- Divine Mercy image
- Divine Mercy Sunday
- Divine Mercy Sanctuary (Kraków)
- Divine Mercy Sanctuary (Płock)
