= Love and Mercy: Faustina =

- Polish: Miłość i miłosierdzie
- Directed by: Michał Kondrat
- Written by: Elisa Bahr
- Release date: March 29, 2019
- Running time: 104 minutes
- Country: Poland
- Language: Polish

Faustina, Apostle of Mercy (Polish: Miłość i miłosierdzie) is a biographical, Polish documentary film directed by Michał Kondrat. It traces the life of Faustina Kowalska who was a nun of the Merciful Jesus and Polish mystic nicknamed "the apostle of divine Mercy". The film premiered to cinemas in Poland on 29 March 2019.

== Synopsis ==
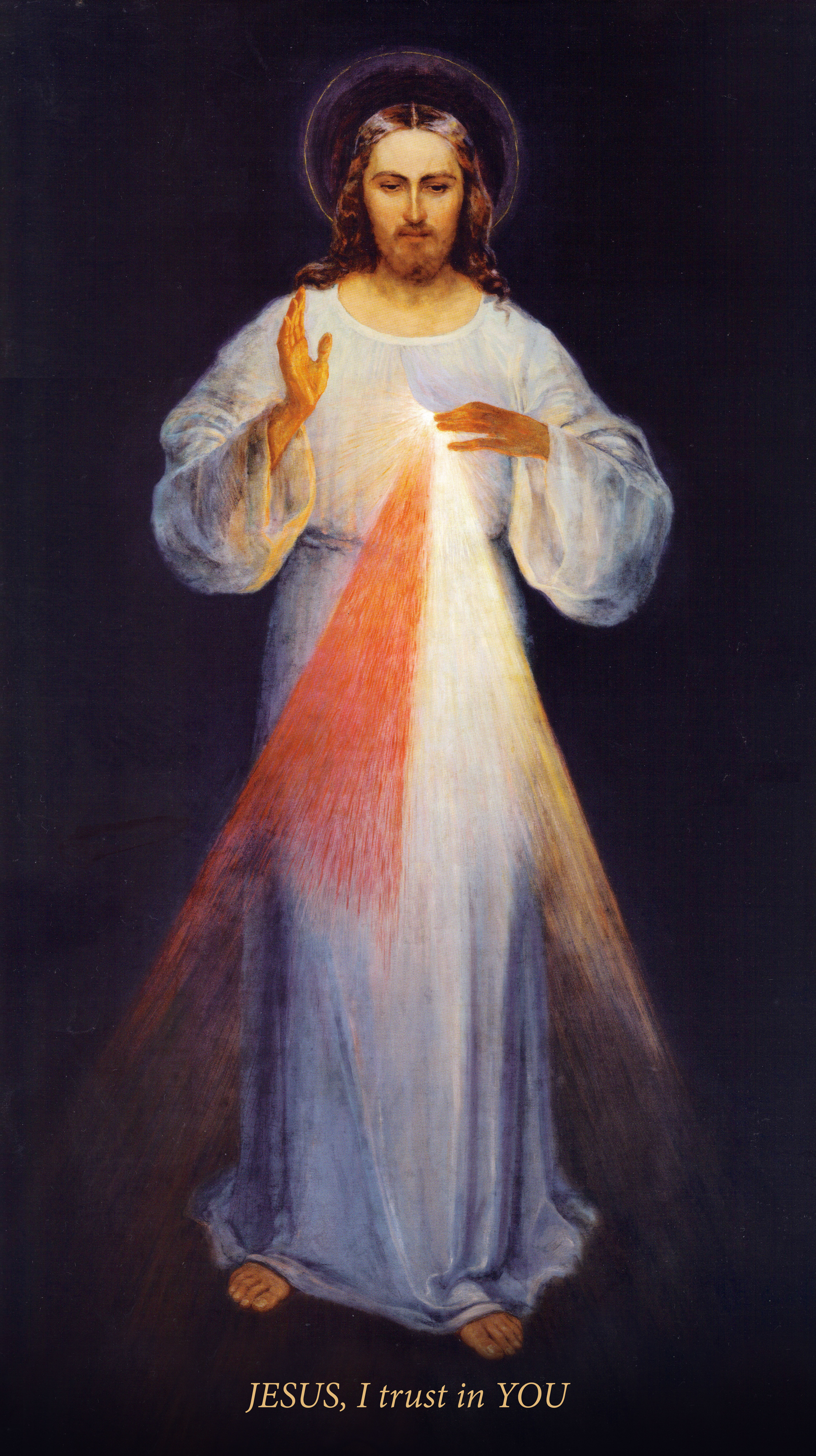
Vision of Jesus, received by Sister Faustina and painted by Eugeniusz Kazimirowski

Following the apparitions of Jesus in the 1930s, Sister Faustina had to disseminate messages of divine mercy to the world. Supported spiritually by the priest Michel Sopoćko and with the help of her visions, she will have the painting "Jesus, I trust in you" painted by the painter Eugeniusz Kazimirowski.

Numerous interviews retrace the post-mortem events of Sister Faustina's work, from the prohibition of the worship of the Sisters of Merciful Jesus to her rehabilitation and the beatification of Sister Faustina in 1993 by Pope John Paul II.

== Cast ==
- director:Michał Kondrat
- writer: Elisa Bahr
- Kamila Kaminska as Sister Faustyna Kowalska
- Janusz Chabior as Eugeniusz Kazimirowski
- Maciej Malysa as Father Michał Sopoćko

== See also ==
- Divine Mercy: No Escape, a 1987 American film which also depicts the life of Faustina Kowalska
- Divine Mercy: Sa Buhay ni Sister Faustina ("In the Life of Sister Faustina"; Philippines, 1993)
- Faustina (Poland, 1995)
- The Last Appeal: The Life of Faustina The Apostle of Divine Mercy (2009)
