= Divine Mercy Sanctuary, Kraków =

Church building in Kraków, Poland

Coordinates: 50°01′12″N 19°56′15″E

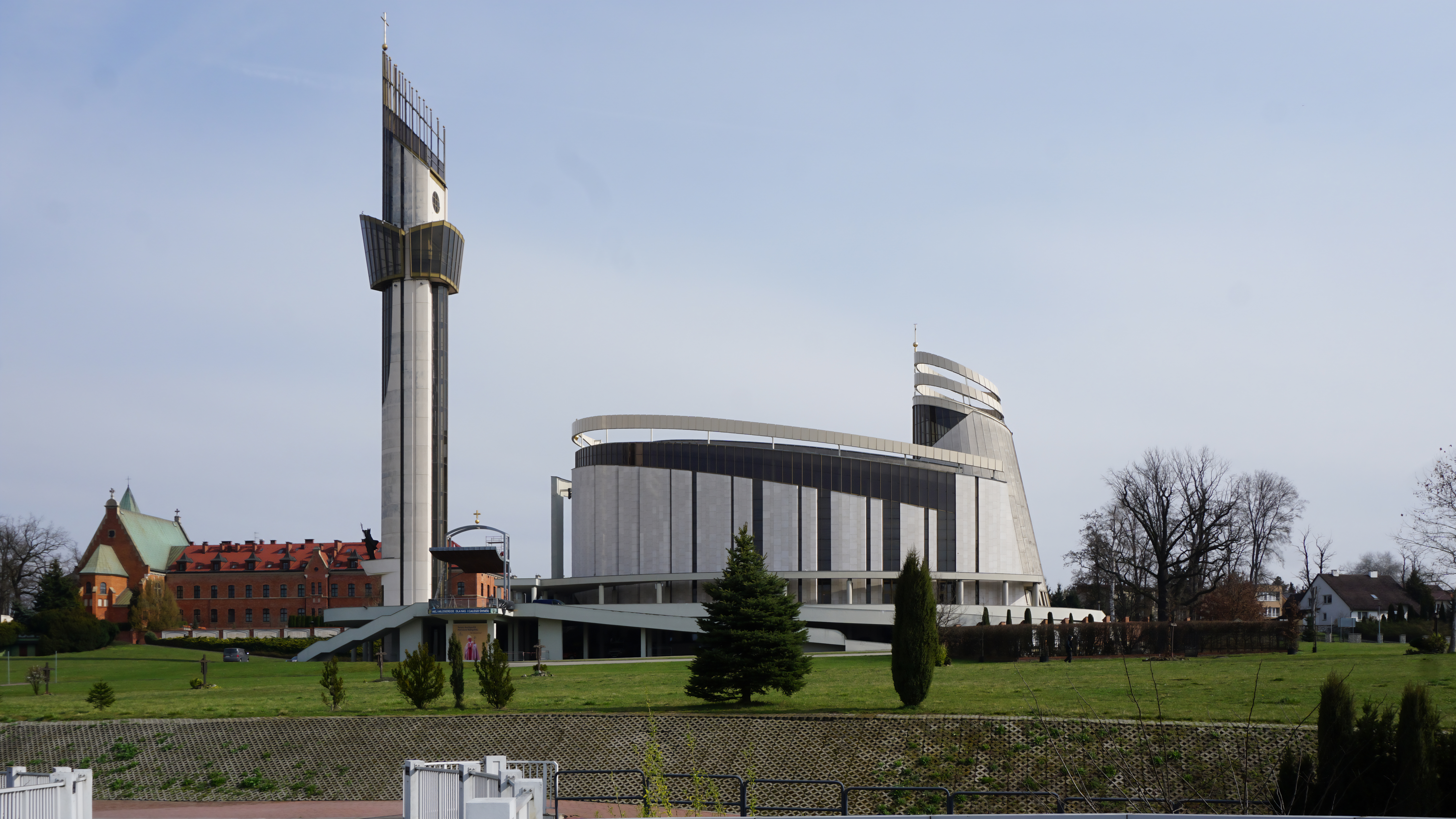
The Sanctuary of the Divine Mercy

The Divine Mercy Sanctuary (Polish: Sanktuarium Bożego Miłosierdzia) in Kraków, Poland, is a Roman Catholic basilica dedicated to the devotion of the Divine Mercy, and is the resting place of Saint Faustina Kowalska.

The new basilica was built between 1999 and 2002, and is located in the District of Łagiewniki at św. Faustyny street. Three popes have visited the shrine and millions of pilgrims from around the world continue to visit it every year.

== History ==
The site of the building originally housed the neo-Gothic monastery complex of the Sisters of Our Lady of Mercy (founded in 1862), which was designed by Charles Zaremba and was built between 1889 and 1891. In 1966, the remains of Sister Faustina were moved to the church. In 1968 Cardinal Karol Wojtyła (later Pope John Paul II) designated the church as a shrine, thanks to the remains of Sister Faustina.

In 1985, Pope John Paul II called Łagiewniki the "capital of the Divine Mercy devotion". Since the beatification of Saint Faustina in 1993, her remains rest on the altar, below the image of Divine Mercy.

== Interior design and architectural form of the basilica ==
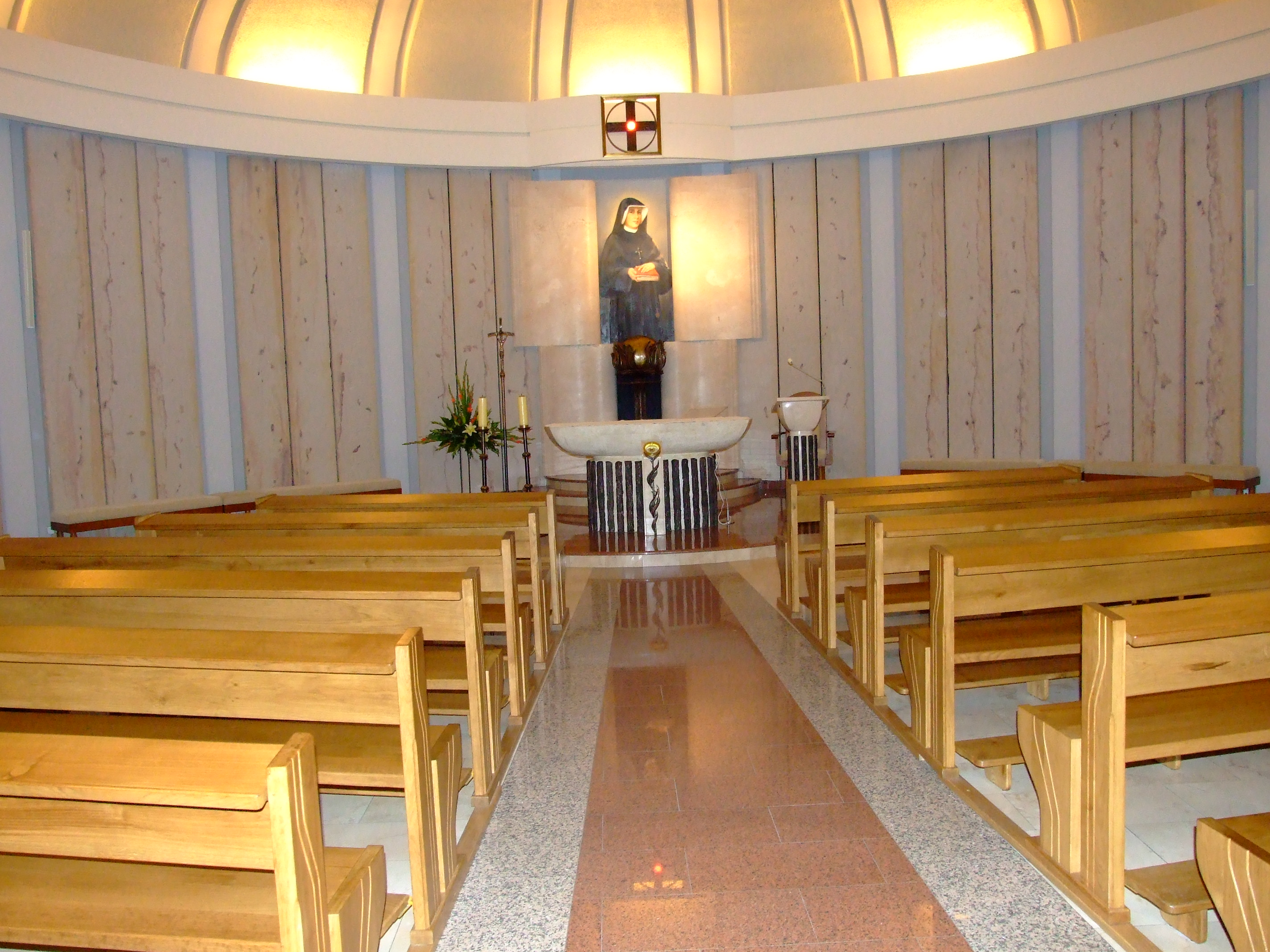
Faustina's chapel at the sanctuary

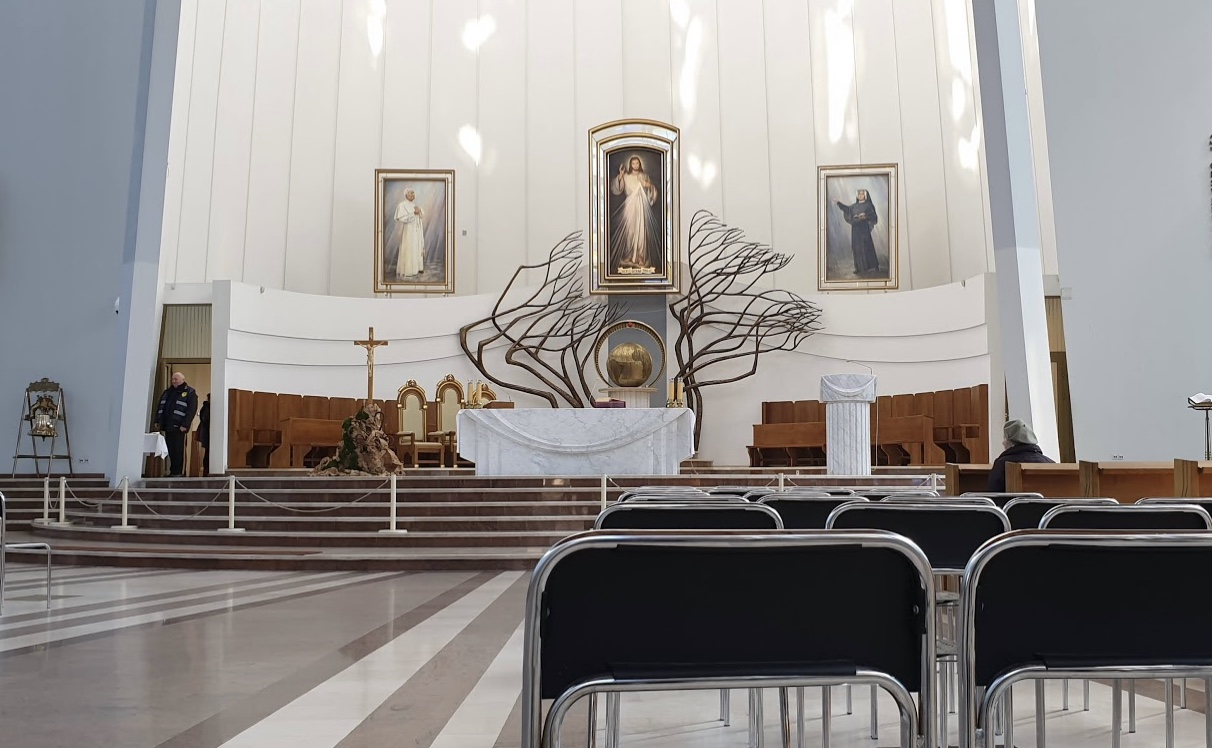
Altar

In 1999–2002, a modern two-story, ellipsoidal basilica, specifically devoted to the Divine Mercy, was built. The building was designed to resemble a boat, and has a 77-meter-high (253 ft) observation tower that resembles a mast.

The basilica can accommodate about 5,000 people and the main chapel has about 1,800 seats. The altar in the main sanctuary houses the Divine Mercy painting and relics of Saint Faustina. The image above the main altar was painted by Adolph Hyla in 1944, and replaces the first image Hyla painted in 1943 as a votive offering for surviving during World War II. The image and the basilica are a major pilgrimage site and in 2011 the basilica received around two million pilgrims from around the world.

The lower level of the church has a central chapel dedicated to Saint Faustina, with four side chapels. The upper part of the basilica has free-standing post-modern Chapel of Perpetual Adoration of the Blessed Sacrament. On June 24, 2007, on the 60th anniversary of Operation Vistula, the basilica opened a Greek Catholic chapel dedicated to reconciliation, and as a gift to the Greek Catholic Church.

== Report of miracle ==
In March 1981, while praying at the tomb of St. Faustina at the church, Maureen Digan of Massachusetts reported a healing. Digan had suffered from lymphedema for decades, and had undergone 10 operations, including a leg amputation. Digan reported that while praying at Faustina's tomb she heard a voice saying "ask for my help and I will help you" and her constant pain stopped.

Upon her return to the US, five Boston area physicians stated that she was healed (with no explanation). Digan's healing was declared miraculous by the Vatican in 1992, and paved the way for the beatification of Faustina Kowalska.

== Papal visits ==
On June 17, 1997, Pope John Paul II visited the church to pray at the tomb of Saint Faustina—an event commemorated by a relief at the entrance to the chapel.

In May 2006, Pope Benedict XVI visited the chapel, and a second relief commemorates that. During the 2006 pilgrimage by Benedict XVI, he unveiled a statue of Pope John Paul II at the observation tower at the basilica, as the seventh sculpture of John Paul II in Kraków.

In July 2016, Pope Francis visited the basilica as part of the Extraordinary Jubilee of Mercy and as part of the World Youth Day celebrations taking place in Kraków.

== See also ==
- Chaplet of the Divine Mercy
- Divine Mercy image
- Divine Mercy Sanctuary (Płock)
- Divine Mercy Sanctuary (Vilnius)
- Divine Mercy Sunday
- Saint Faustina Kowalska
