= Adolf Hyła =

Polish painter and art teacher

Adolf Hyla

Adolf Hyła ([xʲɨwa]; 2 May 1897 – 24 December 1965) was a Polish painter and art teacher. He is known for painting a popular version of the "Divine Mercy image" in 1943.

== Biography ==
Hyła was born in Biala, the son of Józef and Salomea. His brother, Antoni (1908–1975), was a sculptor. Adolf attended school in Kraków from 1903 to 1912, then was a pupil at the Jesuit School in Chyrów, where he obtained his school leaving certificate in 1917. He went on to study painting with Jacek Malczewski. Between 1918 and 1920 his studies were interrupted by intermittent service in the Polish Army. Around that time he worked in the office of the National Kilimkarni. In 1922, he studied art history and philosophy at the Jagiellonian University. He gained his two Fine Arts teaching certificates, first in Kraków in 1930, then in 1936 at the Craft Institute in Warsaw.

He first became an art teacher in a high school in Będzin, then between 1920 and 1948, he taught crafts in various secondary schools in Kraków. Hyła taught drawing and craftwork at the Mikołaj Kopernik Private School, around 1934. Hyła died in Kraków at the age of 68.

== Works ==
Hyła painted the Divine Mercy image for the Divine Mercy Sanctuary, Kraków, as a votive offering for having survived World War II. The image was painted by Hyła five years after the death of Faustina Kowalska in 1938, under the direction of one of her confessors, Józef Andrasz. It was somewhat inspired by an earlier 1934 depiction of the Divine Mercy by Eugeniusz Kazimirowski, a painting that had been supervised by Kowalska herself and her other confessor, Michał Sopoćko. Hyła's original version had Christ against a country landscape background, but this was deemed "non-liturgical" and was subsequently edited out of the second, more familiar, depiction of the subject.

Hyła also painted several portraits, including those of Albert Chmielowski, Józef Piłsudski, the Capuchin Provincial, Kazimierz Niczyński and a series of landscapes including:

- the Roman Forum in Rome 1931
- Church on Obidowa 1934 at Świnica
- Slope of Czarny Staw Gąsienicowy 1936
- The Czarny Dunajec river in Witów 1937
- Kościeliska Valley 1947
- Seascape in Orłowo 1947
- The coast in Sopot 1958.

=== Copyright of his Divine Mercy image ===
When on the instruction of Archbishop Karol Wojtyła, preparations began for the beatification of Faustyna Kowalska, Hyła donated the copyright of his painting to Kowalska's order of nuns, the Our Lady of Mercy convent in Kraków. He wanted the revenue from the sale of his image to support Kowalska's beatification process. Hyła actually died before the process started.
