= Divine Mercy (Catholic devotion) =

Catholic devotion

The Divine Mercy is a Catholic devotion to the mercy of God associated with the reported apparitions of Jesus to Faustina Kowalska.

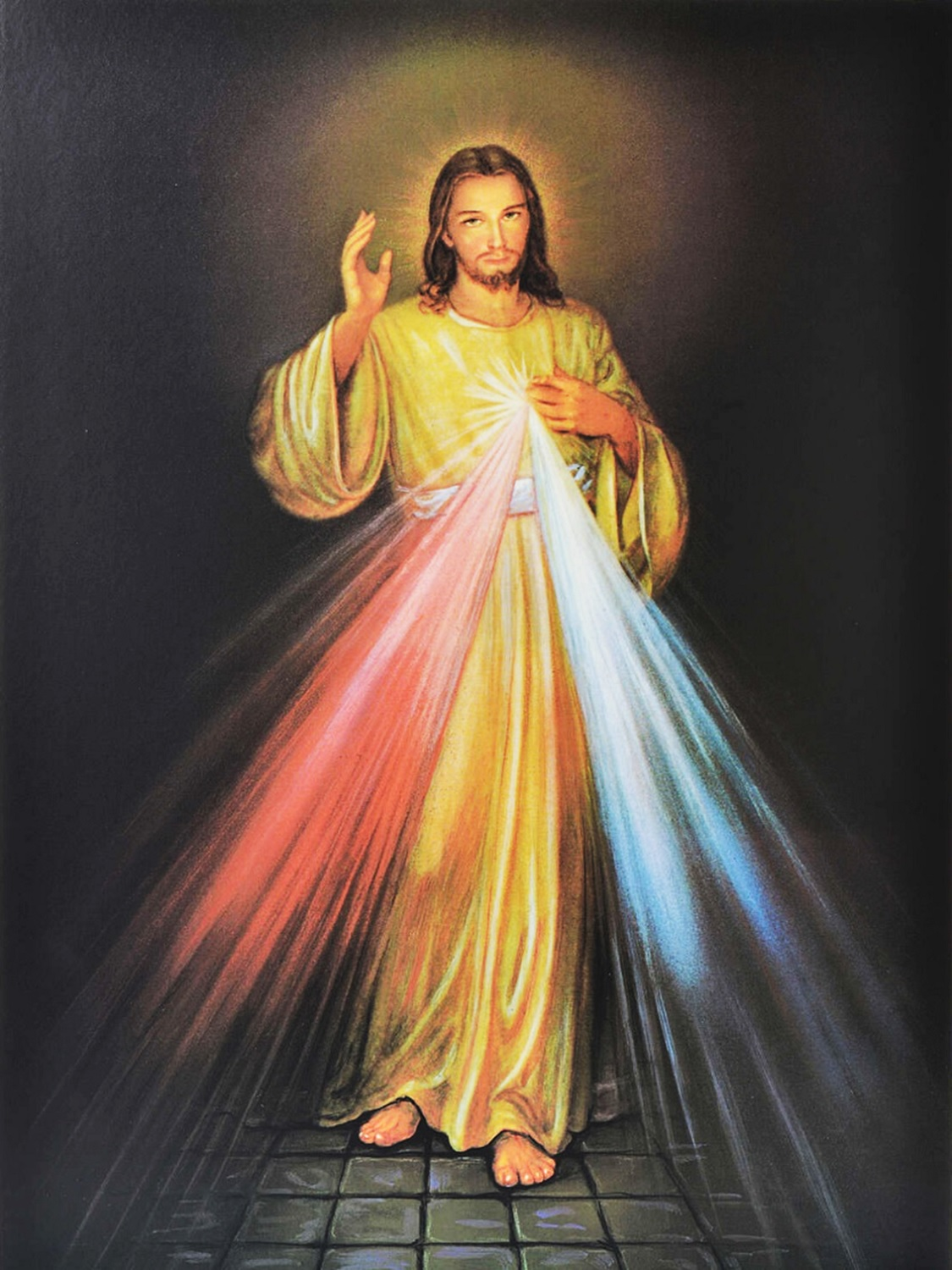
Divine Mercy image

The Divine Mercy devotion is composed of several practices such as the Divine Mercy Sunday, the Chaplet of the Divine Mercy or the Divine Mercy image, which Kowalska describes in her diary as "God's loving mercy" towards all people, especially for sinners. According to Kowalska's writings, this devotion and practices were asked by Jesus Christ himself during his reported apparitions.

Kowalska was granted the title "Secretary of Mercy" by the Holy See in the Jubilee Year of 2000.

== Devotion ==
In February 1931, in Płock, Faustina Kowalska had visions of Jesus who tasked her with spreading a devotion to his Divine Mercy. Kowalska reported a number of apparitions which she described in her 1934–1938 diary, later published as the book Diary: Divine Mercy in My Soul. The two main themes of the devotion are to trust in Christ's endless goodness, and to show mercy to others acting as a conduit for God's love towards them.

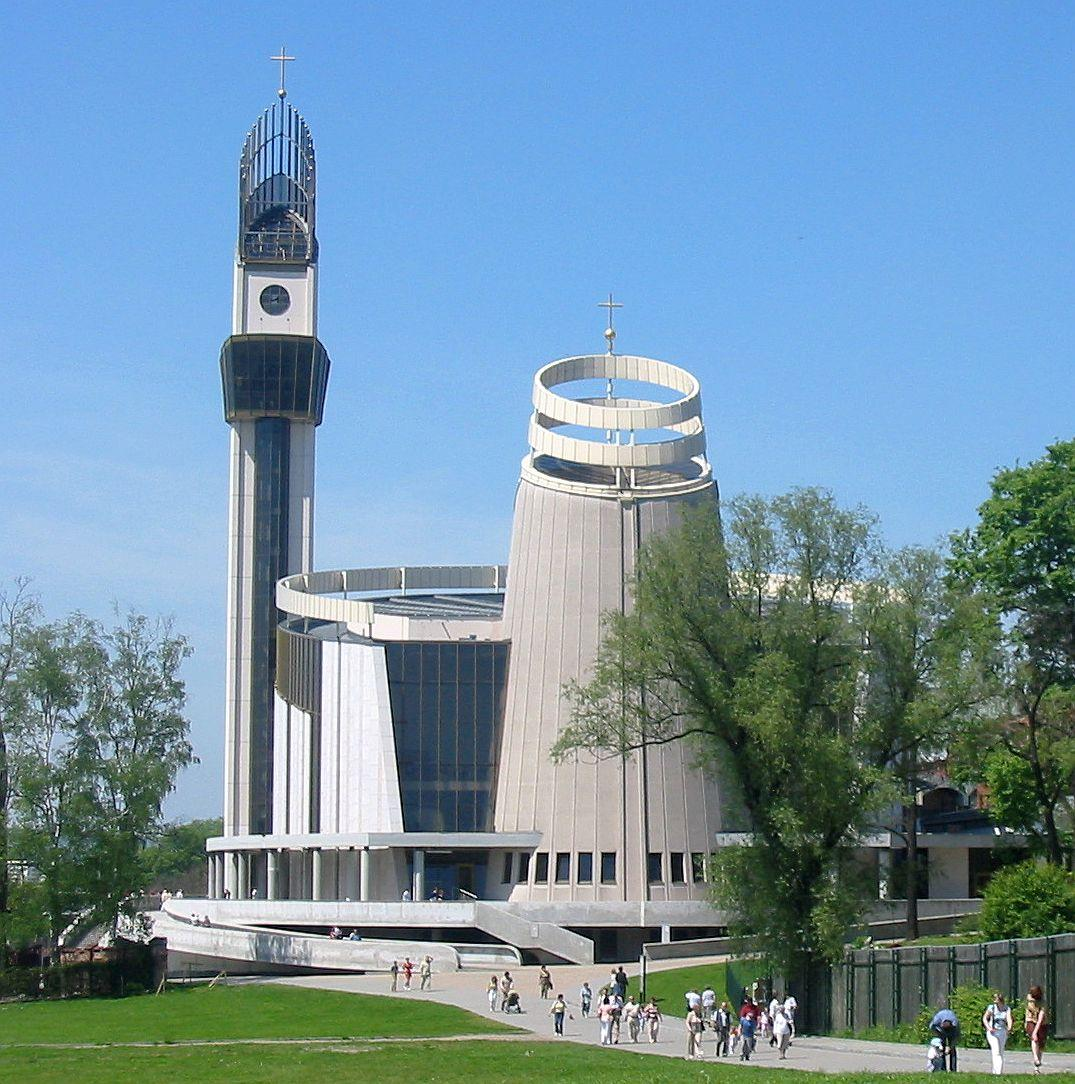
The Sanctuary of the Divine Mercy in Kraków, Poland

The primary focus of the Divine Mercy devotion is the merciful love of God and the desire to let that love and mercy flow through one's own heart towards those in need of it. As he dedicated the Shrine of the Divine Mercy, Pope John Paul II referred to this when he said: "Apart from the mercy of God there is no other source of hope for humankind". There are seven main forms of this devotion:

1. The Divine Mercy image with the specific inscription Jesus, I trust in You;
2. The commemoration of the Feast of the Divine Mercy Sunday
3. The recitation of the Chaplet of the Divine Mercy
4. The recitation of the Divine Mercy novena
5. The designation of the Hour of Mercy at 3:00 p.m.
6. Spreading mercy by word, deed, or prayer
7. The spreading of works of mercy to the whole humanity, in preparation for the return of Jesus Christ to Earth

Proclaim that mercy is the greatest attribute of God.

— Words attributed to Jesus by Kowalska in her diary.

As in the prayers that form the Chaplet of the Divine Mercy, there are three main themes to the Divine Mercy devotion: to ask for and obtain the mercy of God, to trust in Christ's abundant mercy, and finally to show mercy to others and act as a conduit for God's mercy towards them.

The first and second elements relate to the signature "Jesus I trust in You" on the Divine Mercy image and Kowalska stated that on 28 April 1935, the day the first Divine Mercy Sunday was celebrated, Jesus told her: "Every soul believing and trusting in My Mercy will obtain it."

The third component is reflected in the statement "Call upon My mercy on behalf of sinners" attributed to Jesus in Kowalska's diary (Notebook I, items 186–187). This statement is followed in the diary by a specific short prayer: "O Blood and Water, which gushed forth from the Heart of Jesus as a fount of Mercy for us, I trust in You." which Kowalska also recommended for the Hour of Divine Mercy. In her diary (Notebook II, item 742) Kowalska wrote that Jesus told her: "I demand from you deeds of mercy, which are to arise out of love for Me." and that he explained that there are three ways of exercising mercy toward your neighbor: the first-by deed, the second-by word, the third-by prayer. Kowalska's diary contain also a litany of Divine Mercy (Diary 949).

The Divine Mercy devotion views mercy as the key element in the plan of God for salvation and emphasizes the belief that it was through mercy that God gave his only son for the redemption of humankind, after the fall of Adam. The opening prayer for Divine Mercy Sunday Mass refers to this and begins: "Heavenly Father and God of Mercy, We no longer look for Jesus among the dead, for He is alive and has become the Lord of Life".

In 1959, the Vatican banned the image and devotion to it because of a number of factors. Some Polish bishops questioned Kowalska's claims and were uncomfortable with the image's similarity to the red-and-white Polish flag. Polish priests were reported to be interpreting the rays as a symbol of the flag. The ban on devotion was lifted on 15 April 1978, due to pressure from future Polish pope Karol Wojtyła, who had great interest in Kowalska. In 1987, American filmmaker Hermann D. Tauchert co-wrote, produced, and directed the film Divine Mercy: No Escape, which depicted the life of Kowalska.

== Image ==
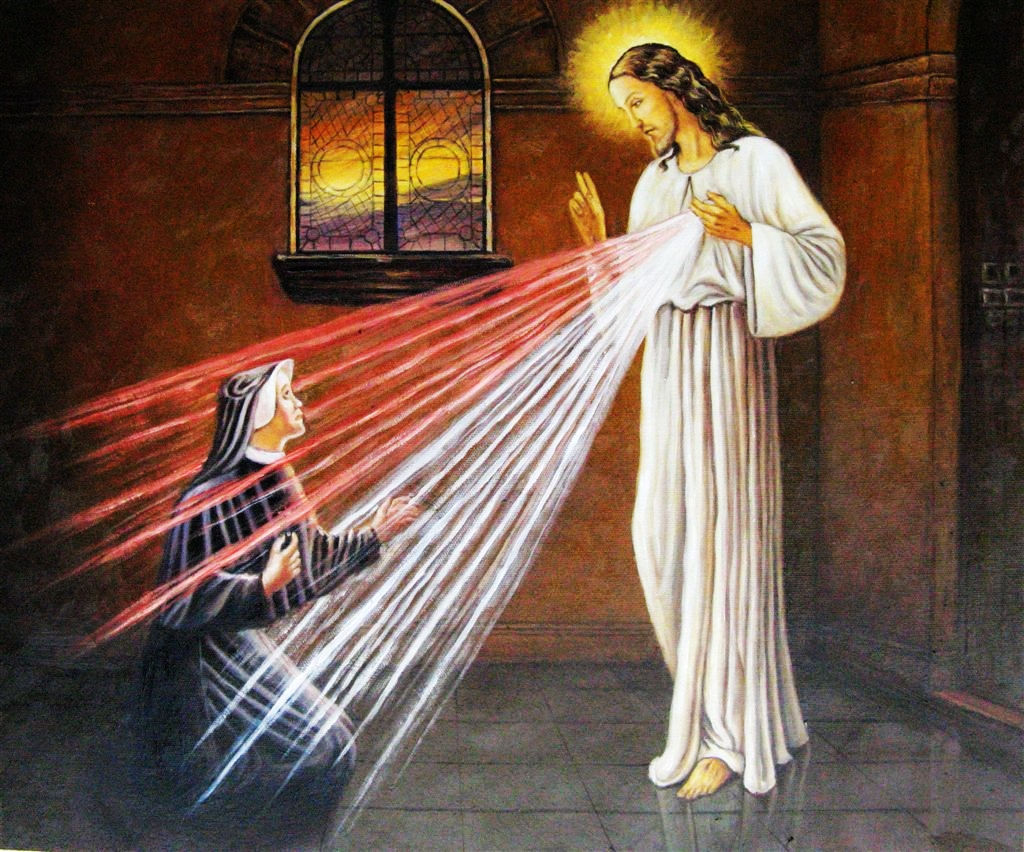
Painting depicting the apparition of the Merciful Jesus to Saint Faustina

Paint an image according to the pattern you see with the signature: Jesus, I trust in You... I promise that the soul that will venerate this image will not perish.

In the image, Jesus stands with one hand outstretched in blessing, the other clutching the side wounded by the spear, from which proceed beams of falling light, coloured red and white. An explanation of these colors was given by Kowalska, which she attributed to Jesus in her diary: "The two rays represent blood and water". These colors of the rays refer to the "blood and water'" of the Gospel of John (John 19:34) which are also mentioned in the optional prayer of the Chaplet. The words "Jesus I Trust in Thee" usually accompany the image (Jezu Ufam Tobie in Polish).

The original Divine Mercy image was painted by Eugeniusz Kazimirowski in Vilnius in 1934 under Kowalska's direction. However, according to her diary, she cried upon seeing that the finished picture was not as beautiful as the vision she had received, but Jesus comforted her saying, "Not in the beauty of the colour, nor of the brush is the greatness of this image, but in My grace". The picture was widely used during the early years of the devotion, and is still in circulation within the movement, but the image painted by Adolf Hyla image remains one of the most reproduced renderings. Hyla painted the image in thanksgiving for having survived World War II.

After the Feast of Divine Mercy Sunday was granted to the Universal Church by Pope John Paul II on 30 April 2000, new versions of the image have emerged from a new generation of Catholic artists.

== Feast day ==
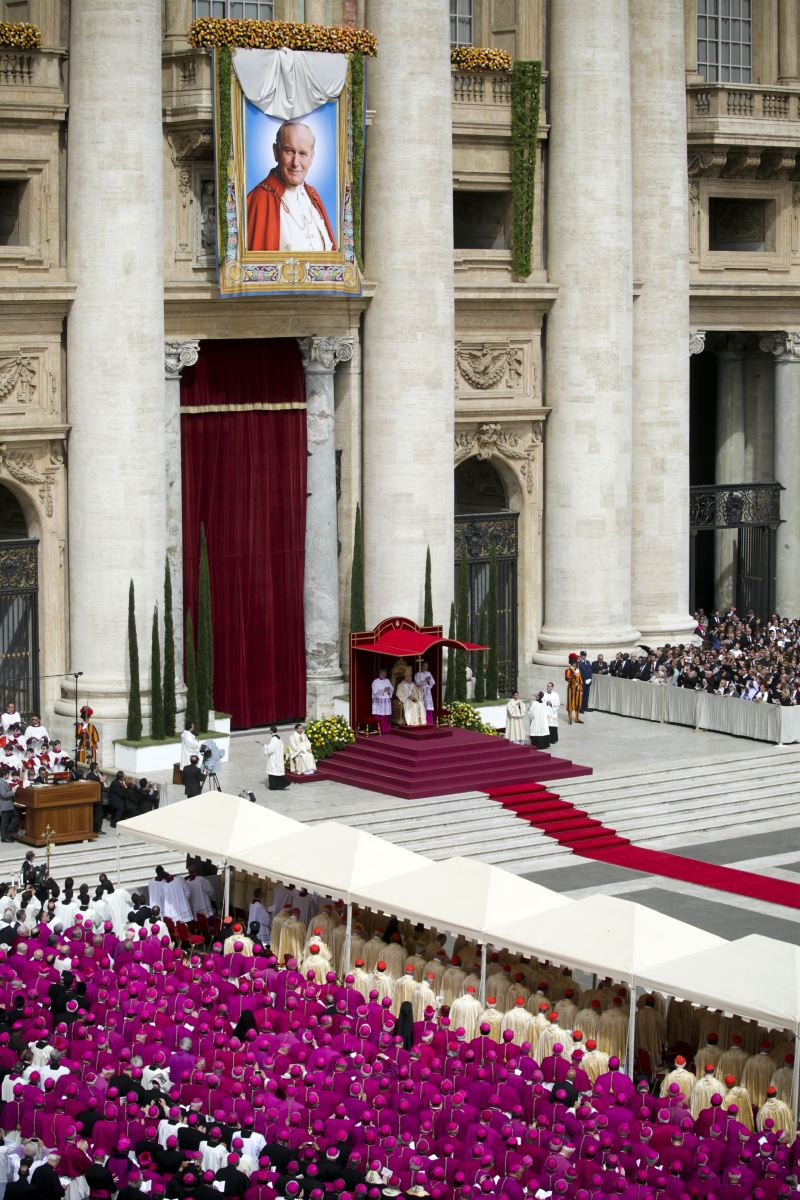
The Feast of the Divine Mercy Sunday on 1 May 2011 in Rome, during the Beatification of Pope John Paul II

The feast of Divine Mercy Sunday was instituted by Pope John Paul II and is celebrated the Sunday after Easter on the General Roman Calendar, and is associated with specific indulgences.

In an entry in her diary, Kowalska stated that anyone who participates in the Mass and receives the sacraments of Confession and the Eucharist on this day is assured by Jesus of full remission of their sins and punishments.

== Chaplet ==
According to Kowalska's writings (Diary 476), the Chaplet of Divine Mercy prayers and structure was dictated to her directly by Jesus on 14 September 1935, as she entered a chapel in Vilnius. The day before, she had a vision of an angel of divine wrath and the Holy Trinity to show her the power of the prayers that make up the chaplet (Diary 474-475).

Faustina wrote that Jesus promised that whoever prays this chaplet will receive great mercy during their lifetime, especially at the hour of death. These graces can also be obtained by the dying by whose bedside others will say this prayer. Kowalska also stated that Jesus promised that anything can be obtained through this chaplet if it is compatible with his will.

The chaplet is prayed on an ordinary rosary, though according to the Congregation, the chaplet should not be prayed the same way as the rosary and recited as Jesus dictated it without interruption and change in the prayers.

== Hour of Mercy ==
The Hour of Mercy is a daily devotional practice based on the writings of Faustina Kowalska, who recorded in her diary that Jesus instructed her to pray for his mercy at 3:00 p.m. each day and meditate on his Passion. According to her congregation, this prayer and meditation should be performed at 3:00 p.m., addressed directly to Christ, and should invoke the merits of His Passion to obtain its spiritual benefits and related promise.

On 10 October 1937, in her diary (Notebook IV, item 1320) Kowalska attributed the following statement to Jesus::

At three o’clock, implore My mercy, especially for sinners; and, if only for a brief moment, immerse yourself in My Passion, particularly in My abandonment at the moment of agony. This is the hour of great mercy. In this hour, I will refuse nothing to the soul that makes a request of Me in virtue of My Passion. (Diary 1320)

Later, in February 1938, still according to Kowalska, Christ said to her about this hour (Notebook V, item 1572):

As often as you hear the clock strike the third hour, immerse yourself completely in My mercy, adoring and glorifying it; invoke its omnipotence for the whole world, and particularly for poor sinners; for at that moment mercy was opened wide for every soul. In this hour you can obtain everything for yourself and for others for the asking; it was the hour of grace for the whole world — mercy triumphed over justice. (Diary 1572)

An example of how to practice it was provided to Kowalska by Christ in the same entry:

My daughter, try your best to make the Stations of the Cross in this hour, provided that your duties permit it; and if you are not able to make the Stations of the Cross, then at least step into the chapel for a moment and adore, in the Most Blessed Sacrament, My Heart, which is full of mercy; and should you be unable to step into the chapel, immerse yourself in prayer there where you happen to be, if only for a very brief instant. (Diary 1572)

The time of 3:00 p.m. corresponds to the hour at which Jesus died on the cross. This hour is now called the "Hour of Divine Mercy" or the "Hour of Great Mercy".

== Orders and institutions ==
A number of Christian orders and institutions are devoted to the Divine Mercy. The John Paul II Institute of Divine Mercy is managed by the Congregation of Marian Fathers, which takes an active role in promoting the Divine Mercy message.

The Congregation of the Sisters of Our Lady of Mercy, to which Kowalska belonged, and the Congregation of Sisters of Merciful Jesus, established by Michał Sopoćko on the request of Christ reported by Kowalska, also have a very important role in spreading the devotion.

The World Apostolic Congress on Mercy takes place every third year in various cities of the world. Continental congresses on Mercy also take place.

== See also ==
- Sanctuary of the Divine Mercy, Vilnius
- Divine Mercy Sanctuary, Kraków
- Divine Mercy Sanctuary (Płock)
- Compassion
- Sacred Heart
- Atonement in Christianity
- Crucifixion of Jesus
