= Eugeniusz Kazimirowski =

Polish artist (1873–1939)

- Kazimirowski in 1933
- Born: 11 November 1873; Wygnanka Górna, Russian Empire
- Died: 23 September 1939 (aged 65); Białystok, Soviet-occupied Poland
- Education: Kraków Academy of Fine Arts
- Notable work: Divine Mercy image
- Movement: Realism
- Awards: Cross of Merit

Eugeniusz Marcin Kazimirowski (11 November 1873 – 23 September 1939) was a Polish painter, and member of the realism movement. He is best known for the first depiction of the Divine Mercy image in 1934, based on a request from Faustyna Kowalska and her confessor Michael Sopoćko.

== Background ==
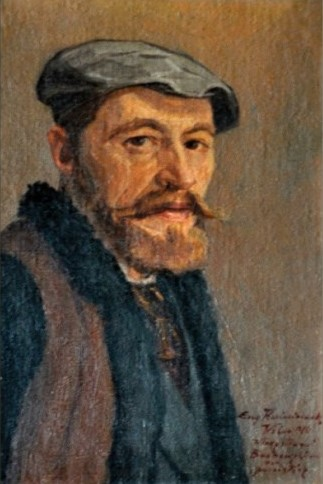
Self-portrait of Kazimirowski

Kazimirowski studied painting at the Kraków Academy of Fine Arts 1892–1897. He continued his studies in Munich, Paris and Rome. After World War I, he moved from Kraków to Vilnius. He taught at the Vilnius Teacher Training Institute and worked on theatrical design in Vilnius. He painted mostly landscapes and portraits.

Kazimirowski's Divine Mercy was first shown in public at the Easter ceremonies of 25–28 April 1934, and the first Mass with the Divine Mercy image was celebrated by Rev. Michael Sopoćko at the Gate of Dawn church in Vilnius, on 28 April 1935 the second Easter Sunday, long before the Vatican approved the term Divine Mercy Sunday in 2000.

Most of Kazimirowski's works were lost in World War II. He died in 1939 in Białystok.

== See also ==
- Adolf Hyła
- Divine Mercy (Catholic devotion)
- List of unsolved deaths
- Sanctuary of the Divine Mercy, Vilnius
