= Divine Mercy image =

Depiction of Jesus Christ

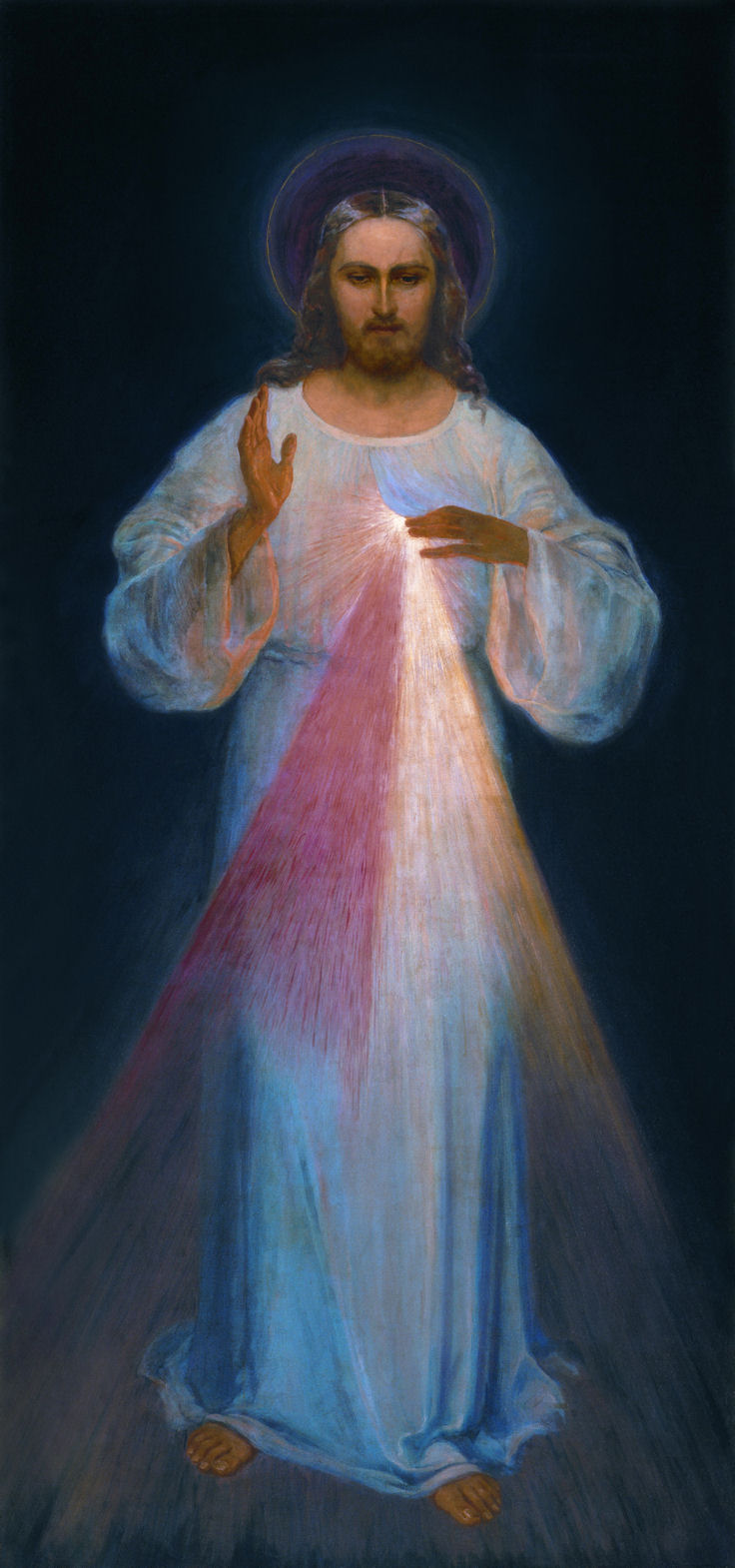
Divine mercy image

The image of the Divine Mercy is a depiction of Jesus Christ that is based on the Divine Mercy devotion initiated by Faustina Kowalska.

According to Kowalska's diary, Jesus told her "I promise that the soul that will venerate this image will not perish. I also promise victory over enemies already here on earth, especially at the hour of death. I myself will defend it as My own glory." (Diary 48)

Jesus is shown, in most versions, as raising his right hand in blessing and pointing with his left hand on the Sacred Heart from which flow forth two rays: one red and one pale. The depiction contains the message "Jesus I trust in you" (Polish: Jezu ufam Tobie). The rays that stream out have symbolic meanings: red for the blood of Jesus, and pale for the water (which justifies souls). The whole image is a symbol of charity, forgiveness and love of God, referred to as the "Fountain of Mercy". According to Kowalska's diary, the image is based on her 1931 vision of Jesus.

Kowalska directed the painting of the first image in Vilnius by the artist Eugeniusz Kazimirowski. Since then, numerous versions of the image have been painted by other artists, including a popular rendition by Adolf Hyła in Kraków. They are widely venerated worldwide and are used in the celebration of Divine Mercy Sunday, observed in Roman Catholic as well as some Anglican churches.

== Background ==
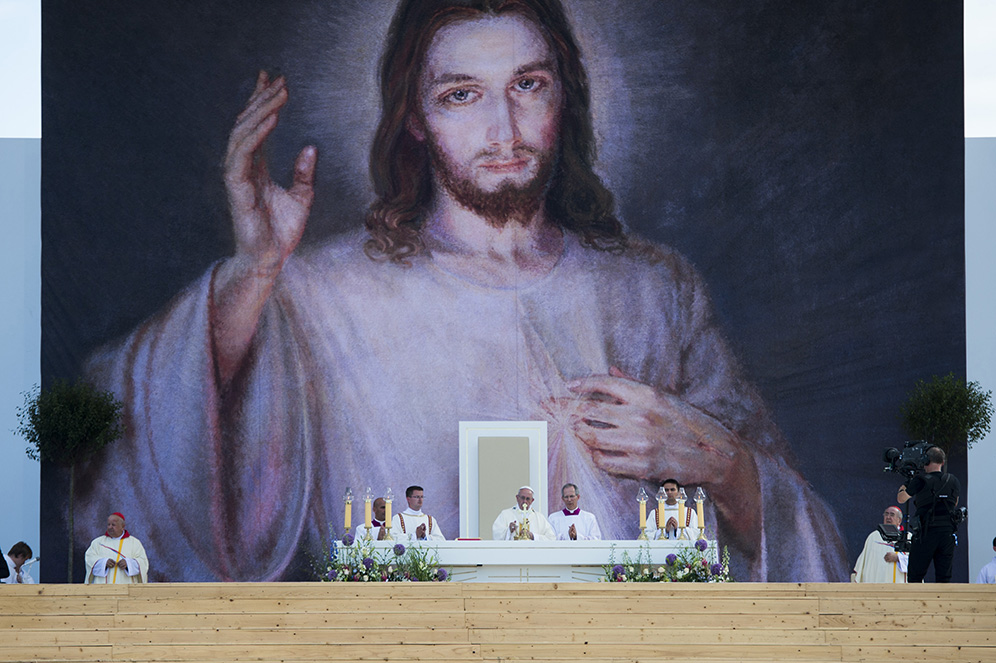
Pope Francis celebrating the Holy Mass in front of the Divine Mercy image at the World Youth Day 2016

Faustina Kowalska was a Polish nun who joined the convent of Our Lady of Mercy, in Warsaw, in 1925. In her diary, which was later published as the book Diary: Divine Mercy in My Soul, Kowalska wrote about a number of visions of Jesus and conversations with him. Her confessor was Michael Sopocko, a priest and a professor of theology.

In 1930, Kowalska was assigned to the convent in Płock, Poland. Kowalska stated that in her cell on the night of Sunday, 22 February 1931, Jesus appeared to her as the "King of Divine Mercy" and was robed in a white garment.

Kowalska wrote that Jesus' right hand was raised in a sign of blessing, the other was touching the garment near his breast, and that from beneath the garment slightly down, aside his breast, emanated two large rays, one red, the other white.

In her diary (Notebook 1, items 47 and 48), she wrote that Jesus told her:

Paint an image according to the pattern you see, with the signature: "Jesus, I trust in You". I desire that this image be venerated, first in your chapel, and then throughout the world. I promise that the soul that will venerate this image will not perish.

Another nun, Sister Christine, later stated that rays of light from the window were visible that night and attracted the attention of people standing on the other side of the street, implying that it was a "physical" appearance, rather than an interior vision.

Not knowing how to paint, Kowalska approached some other nuns at her convent for help but received no assistance. She attempted to sketch the image with charcoal on canvas but had little success. In her diary (Notebook 1, item 53), she wrote that Jesus told her that she would receive "visible help" with the task. In November 1932, Kowalska left Płock and returned to Warsaw, and in May 1933, she was sent to the convent in Vilnius to work as the gardener.

In Vilnius, Kowalska met the priest Michał Sopoćko, the newly-appointed confessor to the nuns. Sopocko supported Kowalska's efforts and arranged for the first painting of the image by the artist Eugeniusz Kazimirowski, which was the only rendition that Kowalska saw. After Kowalska's death, a number of other artists painted their own versions of the image, with the depiction by Adolf Hyła being among the most reproduced ones.

== Devotional significance ==
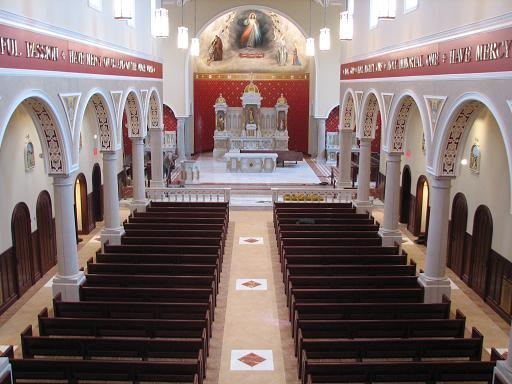
A 2006 rendition of the image above the altar of the sanctuary of the Fathers of Mercy

Not in the beauty of the colour, nor of the brush lies the greatness of this image, but in My grace.
— Words attributed to Jesus by Kowalska in her diary.

In 1959, the Vatican banned the image and its devotion for a number of factors. Some Polish bishops questioned Kowalska's claims and were uncomfortable with the image's similarity to the red-and-white Polish flag. Polish priests were reported to be interpreting the rays as a symbol of the flag. The ban on the image and devotion to it was lifted only on April 15, 1978, after lobbying of Pope Paul VI by Karol Wojtyla, who was a great advocate for Kowalska and who would become Pope John Paul II six months later.

After the canonization of Kowalska in April 2000, devotion to the Divine Mercy and the image has increased. The devotional following of the image and Kowalska's message has been stronger among Catholics at large than among theologians. The author Benedict Groeschel considered a modest estimate of the following in 2010 to be over 100 million Catholics.

Kowalska's diary relates the rays of light within the image to life and salvation, stating (Notebook 1, item 299) that she was told by Jesus:

"The two rays denote Blood and Water. The pale ray stands for the Water which makes souls righteous. The red ray stands for the Blood which is the life of souls.... These two rays issued forth from the very depths of My tender mercy when My agonized Heart was opened by a lance on the Cross."

Kowalska also wrote that Jesus stressed the importance of the image as part of the Divine Mercy devotion, and in Notebook 1, item 327, she attributed these words to Jesus:

"I am offering people a vessel with which they are to keep coming for graces to the fountain of mercy. That vessel is this image with the signature; 'Jesus, I trust in You."

Catholic devotions thus stress the importance of the image as a "conduit for grace" as part of the Divine Mercy message.

Kowalska's diary also relates the image to Divine Mercy Sunday. Kowalska wrote (Notebook 1, item 49) that Jesus told her that he wanted the Divine Mercy image to be "solemnly blessed" on the first Sunday after Easter; and that Sunday was to be the Feast of Mercy.

Pope John Paul II instituted Divine Mercy Sunday (Dominica II Paschae seu de divina misericordia) and placed it on the General Roman Calendar. The Divine Mercy image is often carried in processions on Divine Mercy Sunday and is placed in a location in the church so that it can be venerated by those who attended Mass.

The veneration of the Divine Mercy image also takes place in conjunction with the Divine Mercy Chaplet and Divine Mercy Novena. The Vatican biography of Kowalska states that the veneration of the Divine Mercy image is part of the second component of her message, "entreating God's mercy for the whole world". Praying before the Divine Mercy image (with the signature "Jesus I trust in you") is not only encouraged in Catholic devotions but also mentioned as a partial condition for some of the indulgences associated with Divine Mercy Sunday.

== Artistic renditions ==
=== First painting ===
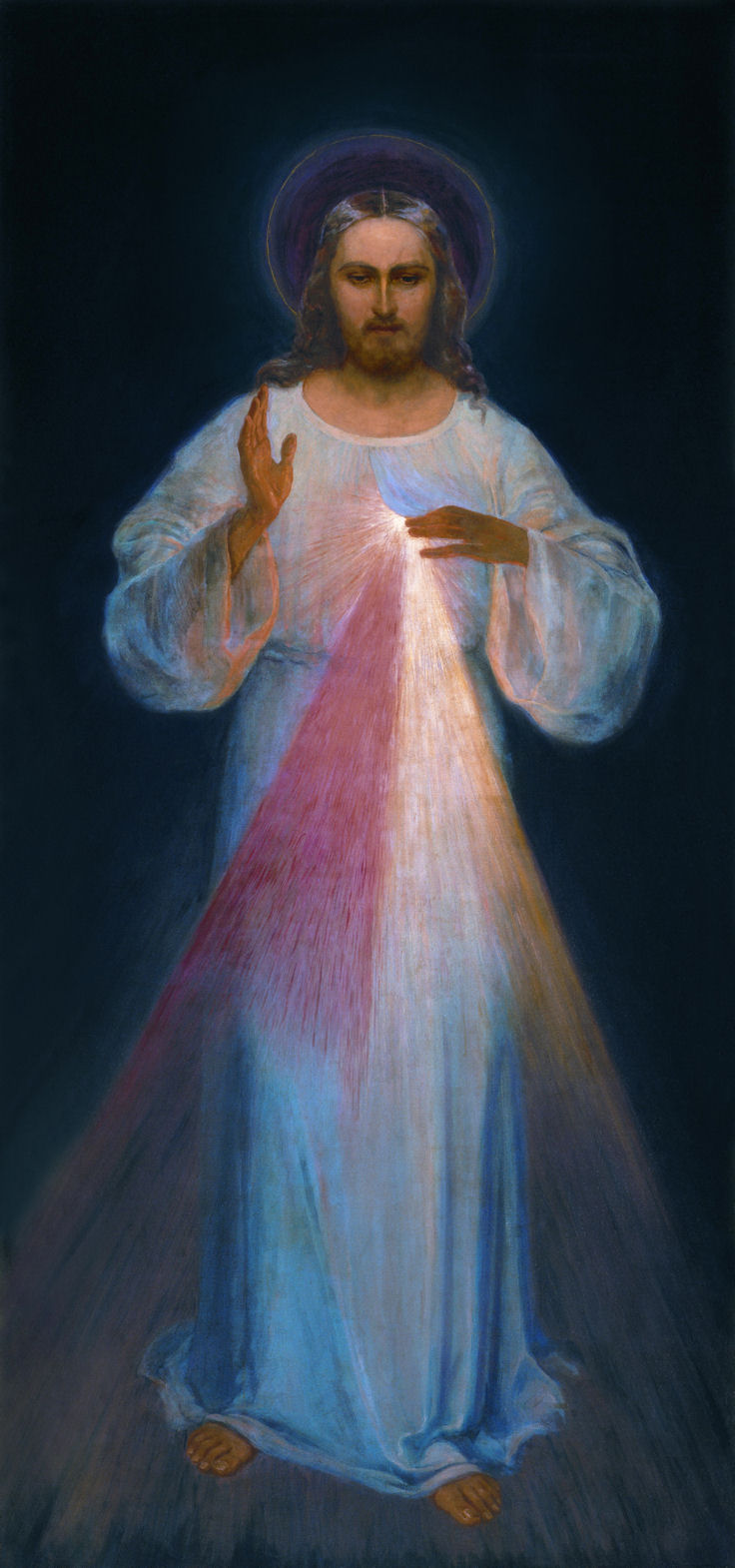
The original Divine Mercy painting by Eugeniusz Kazimirowski (1934) as advised by Sister Faustina. In 2017 the image underwent renovation and restoration to its original form.

The first painting was made by Eugeniusz Kazimirowski, under the supervision of Kowalska and her confessor, Sopoćko, in Vilnius. Sopocko was a professor of theology at the University of Vilnius and introduced Kowalska to Kazimirowski, who was a professor of art there and had painted other religious images. Kowalska gave Kazimirowski specific instructions about the appearance and the posture of the image, which she said she had received from Jesus Christ in a vision. Sopocko himself posed as Jesus for the image as wearing an alb, and both he and Kowalska regularly visited the painter's workshop. The final painting satisfied neither Sopocko nor Kowalska, who later wrote that Jesus told her it was not that important for the picture to be beautiful since true beauty would be the blessing that he would bestow upon people by means of the painting.

After its completion in 1934, the Kazimirowski painting first hung in the Bernardine Sisters' convent near the church of St. Michael, where Sopoćko was a rector. In her diary, Kowalska wrote that Jesus told her to inform her confessor that the proper place for the painting was in a church, not in the hallway of a convent. The first public exposition of the Kazimirowski painting was on 26–28 April 1935, at the Church of the Gate of Dawn in Vilnius. In 1937, on the Sunday after Easter, later instituted as Divine Mercy Sunday by Pope John Paul II, the painting was put on display beside the main altar in St. Michael's Church in Vilnius. The image, including small reproductions of it on various devotional materials, was used by Sopoćko in promoting devotion to the Divine Mercy.

In 1948, the Soviet authorities, who then occupied Lithuania, closed St. Michael's Church. The painting remained in the disused church building until 1951, when two pious women from Vilnius, Bronė Miniotaitė and Janina Rodzevič, bought the canvas from a guard and concealed it in an attic for several years. Later, they gave it to the parish priest at the Dominican Church of the Holy Spirit for safekeeping, but he chose not to display it in the church. Sopocko, who had relocated to Poland but was unable to take the painting with him, expressed concern about it to his friend Józef Grasewicz, who obtained the painting and moved it to his own parish church in Nova Ruda, Belarus. There, it was displayed and venerated by the local parishioners. In 1970, the Soviets closed that church and used it as a storage warehouse but left the painting hanging in the disused church, where parishioners continued to venerate it in secret. In 1986, Grasewicz arranged for the painting to be replaced by a copy and the original to be secretly transported back to the Church of the Holy Spirit in Vilnius, where it underwent a restoration that significantly changed its appearance, and it was then displayed and venerated in the church. In 2003, the painting, which had deteriorated because of exposure, attempts at cleaning, and the previous restoration, was professionally restored to its original look. In 2005, it was moved to its current location, above the main altar in the Sanctuary of Divine Mercy in Vilnius.

In 2016, a documentary film, The Original Image of Divine Mercy, was released and told the story of the original Divine Mercy painting and its survival over the decades. Made with the co-operation of the Archdiocese of Vilnius, the film included interviews with Jim Gaffigan, Bishop Robert Barron, Harry Connick Jr., and Archbishop Gintaras Grusas, who also served as executive producer.

=== Hyła painting ===
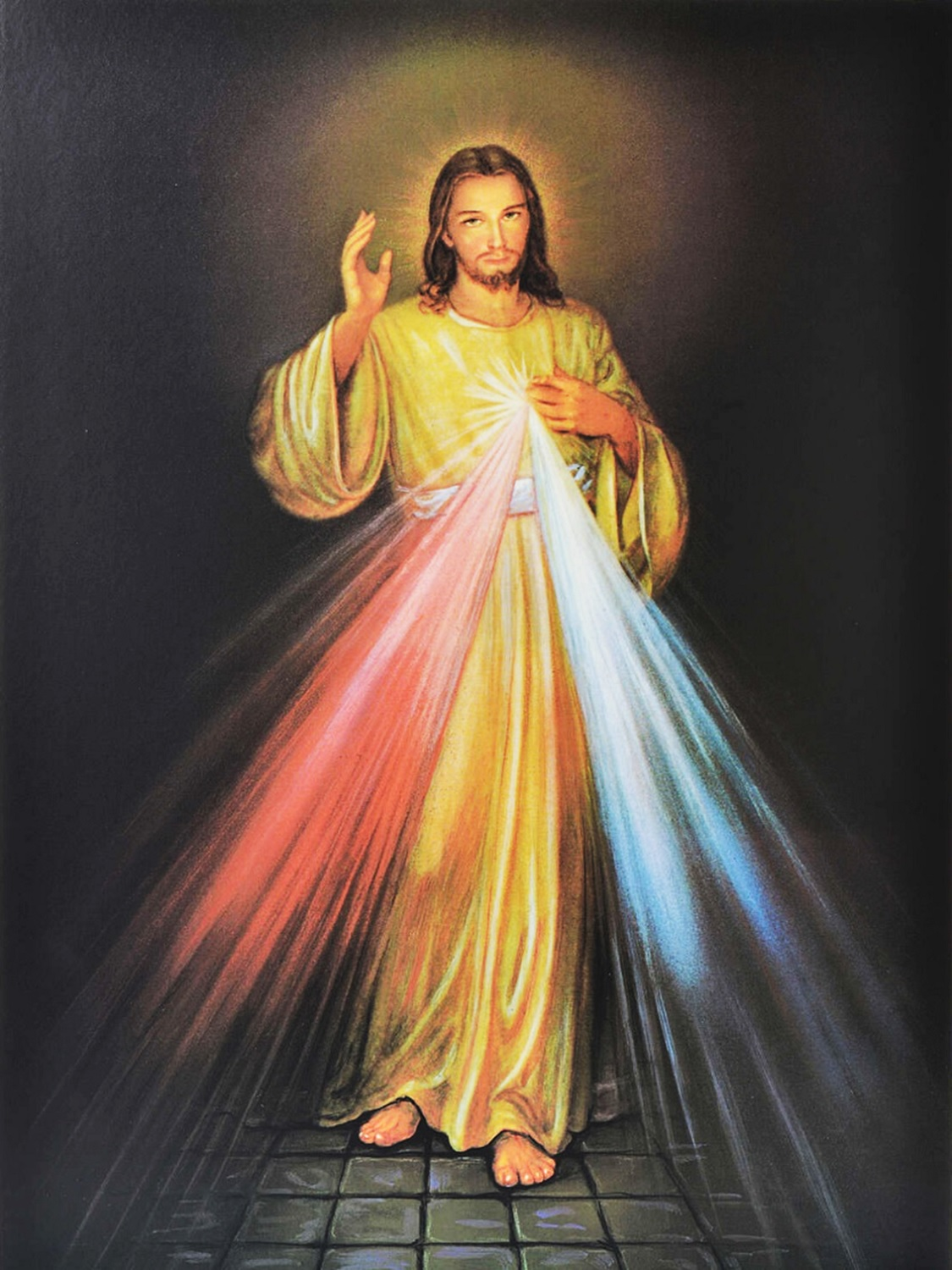
Hyła's version of the Divine Mercy image has been recognised and is used throughout the Roman Catholic Church.

Another painting of the Divine Mercy was made by Adolf Hyła as a votive offering. In painting the picture, Hyła expressed his gratitude for the survival of his family during World War II.

Hyła was given the descriptions from Kowalska's diary by the nuns at the convent and a small copy of the first painting. Hyła's image is somewhat different from Kazimirowski's, as the former figured Jesus as a "Divine Physician" who walks the earth and heals people. He has Jesus approaching the viewer, instead of merely standing. Christ's right hand is lifted up high in benediction, and He is looking into the eyes of the viewer. The original version of the painting had a country landscape in the background, which was removed in a later replica, as it was deemed "non-liturgical".

The Hyła rendition is also called the "Kraków Divine Mercy Image" because it is kept in the sanctuary at Kraków-Łagiewniki at the Divine Mercy Sanctuary, Kraków. Many artistic renditions of this image were created such as The Divine Mercy Parish in Mandaluyong, Philippines, which was constructed in 1992 due to vast devotion of itself since 1985, and the "blue Hyła" version by an American painter Kathleen Weber, depicting the Hyła's rendition of Jesus wearing lighter bluish-white clothing in a dark blue background.

=== Other versions ===
Before Hyła offered his votive painting, the sisters had commissioned Stanisław Batowski to paint a third version. It was lost in a fire, and Batowski painted a fourth painting, which arrived at the convent at almost the same time as Hyła's. Cardinal Sapieha, who happened to be in the convent then, selected the Hyła painting because it was a votive image. A number of other artists have painted the image, but Hyła's rendition remains the most reproduced one.

Another popular image was created in 1982 by American artist Robert Skemp, an illustrator of pop fiction paintings and posters during the baby boomer era. Based on both the original and Hyła's works, the Skemp version depicts Jesus with a bright halo on his head standing on a doorway. Commissioned by the Marian Fathers in the 1970's, the Skemp version, along with Hyła's, are popular in the Philippines.

The Divine Mercy Shrine, Misamis Oriental, in El Salvador, Philippines, was built in 2008, and has a 15.24 m (50 ft) statue of the Divine Mercy towering above the shrine.

== See also ==
- Divine Mercy (Catholic devotion)
- Chaplet of the Divine Mercy
- Divine Mercy Sanctuary (Kraków)
- Divine Mercy Sanctuary (Płock)
- Works of mercy

== Sources ==
- Diary: Divine Mercy in My Soul by Faustina Kowalska 2003 ISBN 1-59614-110-7 (online version)
- Gaskell, Ivan (2009), "Jesus Christ as the divine mercy by Eugeniusz Kazimirowski: the most influential Polish painting of the Twentieth Century?", Ars: časopis Ústavu dejín umenia Slovenskej akadémie vied / Journal of the Institute of Art History of Slovak Academy of Sciences, 42 (1): 81–91
