= Divine Mercy Sunday =

Catholic feast day

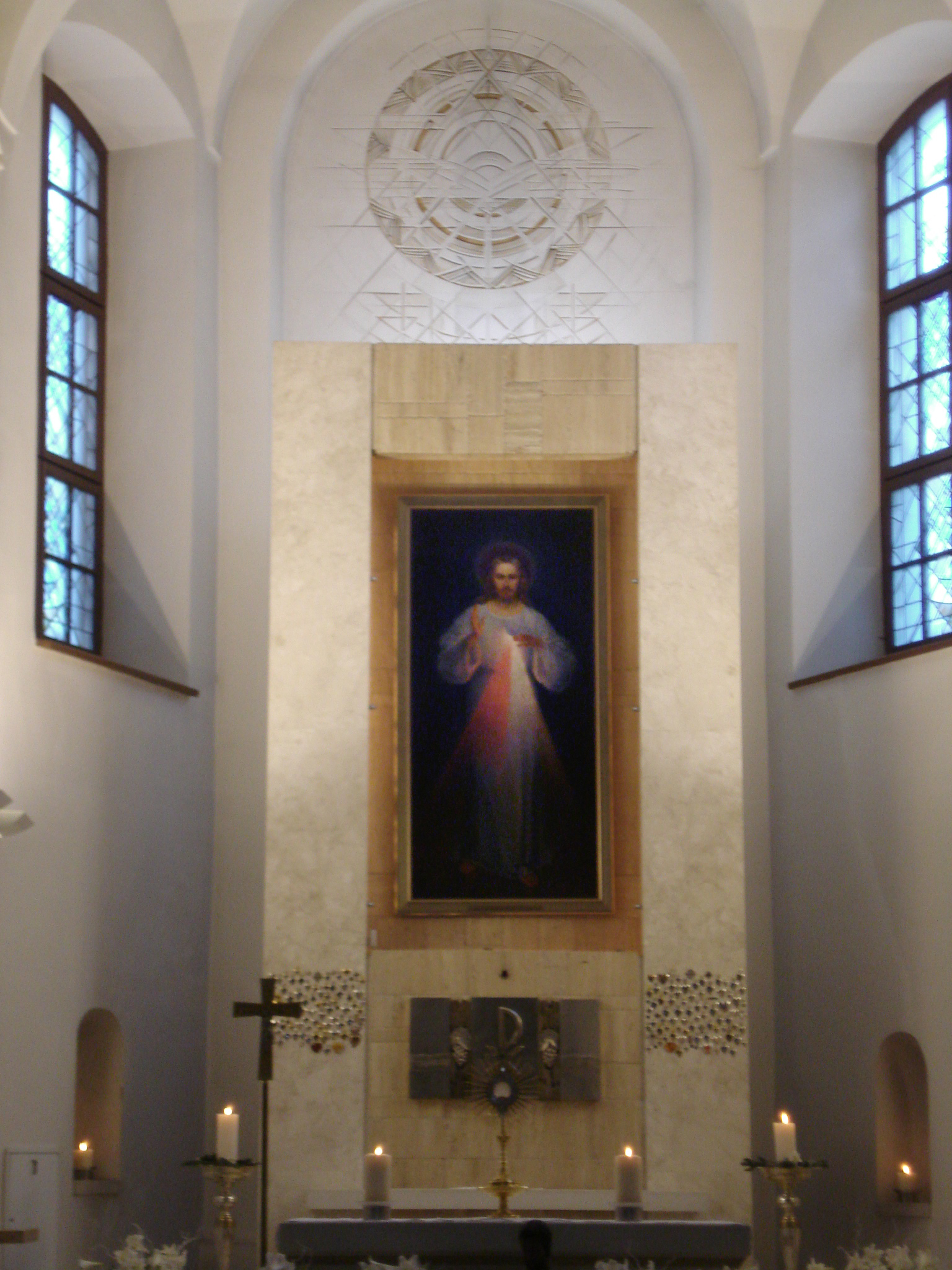
- The first Divine Mercy painting by Kazimierowski (1934) at the Divine Mercy Sanctuary (Vilnius)
- Official name: Feast of the Divine Mercy
- Observed by: Roman Catholic Church
- Observances: Mass, sacramental confession
- Date: Second Sunday of Easter
- 2025 date: April 27
- 2026 date: April 12
- 2027 date: April 4
- 2028 date: April 23
- First time: April 30, 2000; 25 years ago

Divine Mercy Sunday (also known as the Feast of the Divine Mercy) is a feast day that is observed in the Roman Rite calendar, as well as some Anglo-Catholics of the Church of England (it is not an official Anglican feast). It is celebrated on the Second Sunday of Easter, which concludes the Octave of Easter. It is originally based on the Catholic devotion to the Divine Mercy that Faustina Kowalska reported as part of her visions of Jesus, and is associated with special promises from Jesus and indulgences issued by the Catholic Church.

According to the diary of Kowalska, the feast of Divine Mercy receives the biggest promises of grace from Jesus in the Divine Mercy devotion. A person who goes to sacramental confession (the confession may take place some days before) and receives holy communion on that Sunday, shall obtain the total forgiveness of sins and punishments. This grace is similar to the grace received at baptism and greater than a plenary indulgence. Additionally, the Catholic Church also grants a plenary indulgence (observing the usual rules) with the recitation of some simple prayers.

== Devotion to the Divine Mercy ==
Faustina Kowalska, a Polish nun, reported visions and visitations from Jesus and conversations with him. He asked her to paint the vision of his merciful divinity being poured from his Sacred Heart and specifically asked for a feast of Divine Mercy to be established on the first Sunday after Easter Sunday, so that mankind would take refuge in him:

I want the image solemnly blessed on the first Sunday after Easter, and I want it to be venerated publicly so that every soul may know about it.

— Jesus' words, Diary 341

Let all mankind recognize My unfathomable mercy. It is a sign for the end times; after it will come the day of justice.

— Diary 848

Souls perish in spite of My bitter Passion. I am giving them the last hope of salvation; that is, the Feast of My Mercy. If they will not adore My mercy, they will perish for all eternity… tell souls about this great mercy of Mine, because the awful day, the day of My justice, is near.

— Diary 965

Sunday, April 28, 1935. Low Sunday; that is, the Feast of The Divine Mercy, the conclusion of the Jubilee of Redemption. When we went to take part in the celebrations, my heart leapt with joy that the two solemnities were so closely united.

— Faustina's words, Diary 420

This Feast emerged from the very depths of My mercy, and it is confirmed in the vast depths of my tender mercies. Every soul believing and trusting in My mercy will obtain it.

— Jesus' words, Diary 420

Yes, the first Sunday after Easter is the Feast of Mercy, but there must also be deeds of mercy, which are to arise out of love for Me. You are to show mercy to our neighbors always and everywhere. You must not shrink from this or try to absolve yourself from it.

— Diary 742

In several entries in her diary, Kowalska reported a promise of a grace of forgiveness associated to the Feast of Divine Mercy on Mercy Sunday:

Ask of my faithful servant [a priest] that, on this day, he tell the whole world of My great mercy; that whoever approaches the Fountain of Life on this day will be granted complete forgiveness of sins and punishment. Mankind will not have peace until it turns with trust to My mercy.

— Diary 300

I desire that the Feast of Mercy be a refuge and shelter for all souls, and especially for poor sinners. On that day, the very depths of My tender mercy are open. I pour out a whole ocean of graces upon those souls who approach the fount of My mercy. The soul that will go to Confession and receive Holy Communion shall obtain the complete forgiveness of sins and punishment. On that day all the divine floodgates through which grace flow are opened. Let no soul fear to draw near to Me, even though its sins be as scarlet.

— Diary 699

I want to grant a complete pardon to the souls that will go to Confession and receive Holy Communion on the Feast of My Mercy.

— Diary 1109

This special promise of grace of forgiveness is similar to the grace received at baptism and greater than a plenary indulgence. It forgives the punishments due to sin but also the sins themselves and does not require a complete detachment from sin like indulgences do. This would mean that the person would go immediately to heaven without suffering in purgatory if the person would die in that state of grace.

On March 23, 1937, Kowalska wrote in her diary (Notebook III, item 1044) that she had a vision that the feast of Divine Mercy would be celebrated in her local chapel, and would be attended by large crowds, and that the same celebration would be held in Rome attended by the pope. She wrote: "The crowd was so enormous that the eye could not take it all in. Everyone was participating in the celebrations."

Divine Mercy Sunday is also the day after the culmination of the novena of the Chaplet of Divine Mercy. Kowalska wrote Jesus instructed her that the Feast of Mercy (the Sunday after Easter) be preceded by a Divine Mercy Novena which would begin on Good Friday.

The first Mass during which the Divine Mercy image was displayed was on April 28, 1935 (the Feast of Divine Mercy), the second Sunday of Easter, and was attended by Kowalska. (Diary of St. Faustina, item 420). April 28, 1935 was also the celebration of the end of the Jubilee of the Redemption by Pope Pius XI. Michael Sopocko (Kowalska's confessor) celebrated the Mass that Sunday and obtained permission to place the image within the Gate of Dawn church in Vilnius during the Mass.

== Vatican approval ==
The devotion was actively promoted by Pope John Paul II. On April 30, 2000, the Canonization of Faustina Kowalska took place and the second Sunday of Easter was officially designated as the Sunday of the Divine Mercy in the General Roman Calendar. On April 22, 2001, which was one year after establishing Divine Mercy Sunday, Pope John Paul II re-emphasized its message in the resurrection context of Easter:

Jesus said to Sr Faustina one day: "Humanity will never find peace until it turns with trust to Divine Mercy". Divine Mercy! This is the Easter gift that the Church receives from the risen Christ and offers to humanity

The devotion to Divine Mercy Sunday grew rapidly after its designation by Pope John Paul II and is now widely celebrated by Catholics. The Divine Mercy image is often carried in processions on Divine Mercy Sunday, and is placed in a location in the church so that it can be venerated by those who attended the Mass.

The liturgical celebration of Divine Mercy Sunday reflects the devotional elements of Divine Mercy – the former alternate opening prayer of that Mass began with:

Heavenly Father and God of mercy, we no longer look for Jesus among the dead, for he is alive and has become the Lord of life.

This opening prayer refers to divine mercy as the key element in the plan of God for salvation and emphasizes the belief that it was through mercy that God gave his only son for the redemption of mankind, after the fall of Adam.

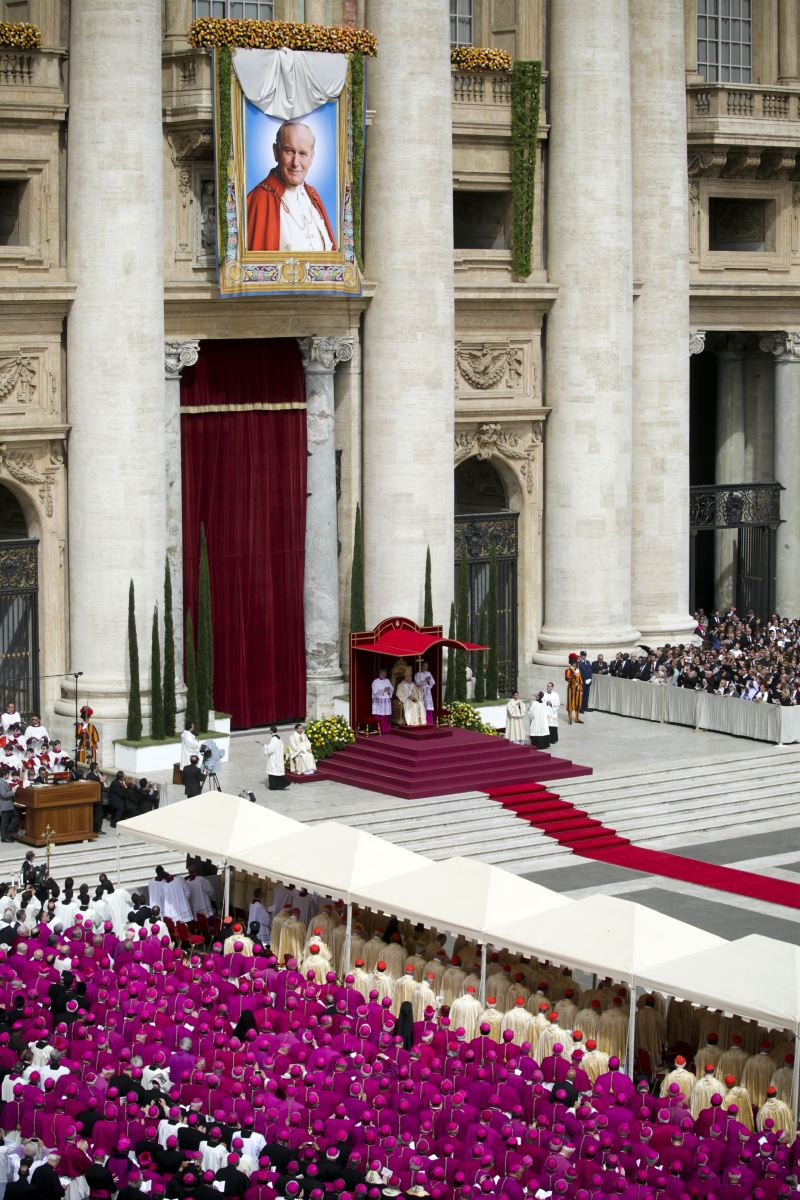
Divine Mercy Sunday, May 1, 2011, at the Vatican included the beatification of Pope John Paul II, for which over a million pilgrims went to Rome.

John Paul II, who died in April 2005 on the vigil of Divine Mercy Sunday, was himself beatified on Divine Mercy Sunday, May 1, 2011, by his successor, Pope Benedict XVI, and was canonized together with Pope John XXIII on Divine Mercy Sunday, April 27, 2014, by Pope Francis.

=== Plenary indulgence ===
In June 2002, John Paul II granted indulgences to Catholics who recite specific prayers on that day, and the grants were then formally decreed by the Apostolic Penitentiary. Priests are encouraged on that day to lead the prayers in honor of Divine Mercy, inform the parishioners about the Divine Mercy, and hear confessions.

==== Conditions ====
The plenary indulgence is obtained by observing the usual dispositions that are in place for the granting of this grace through the intercession of the Catholic Church:

- Participation in the prayers and devotions held in honor of Divine Mercy in a church or chapel while "completely detached from the affection for a sin, even a venial sin", or recitation of the Our Father and the Creed in the presence of the Blessed Sacrament exposed or reserved in the tabernacle, adding the prayer "Merciful Jesus, I trust in you"
- Sacramental confession
- Holy Communion
- Prayer for the intentions of the pope

Additionally, the faithful who, for a justified reason beyond their control, are unable to go to a church or chapel may obtain an indulgence with the recitation of the Our Father and Creed before an image of Jesus, adding the prayer "Merciful Jesus, I trust in you", with the conditions of detachment of sin, and intention to fulfill the dispositions above as soon as possible.

If even this is impossible to achieve, the indulgence can be obtained by the faithful if they "united with those carrying out the prescribed practice for obtaining the indulgence in the usual way", and offer to Jesus a prayer and their sufferings, again with the resolution of fulfilling the normal conditions at the earliest opportunity.
