= Faustina Kowalska =

Nun and saint from Poland

Saint Faustina Kowalska OLM
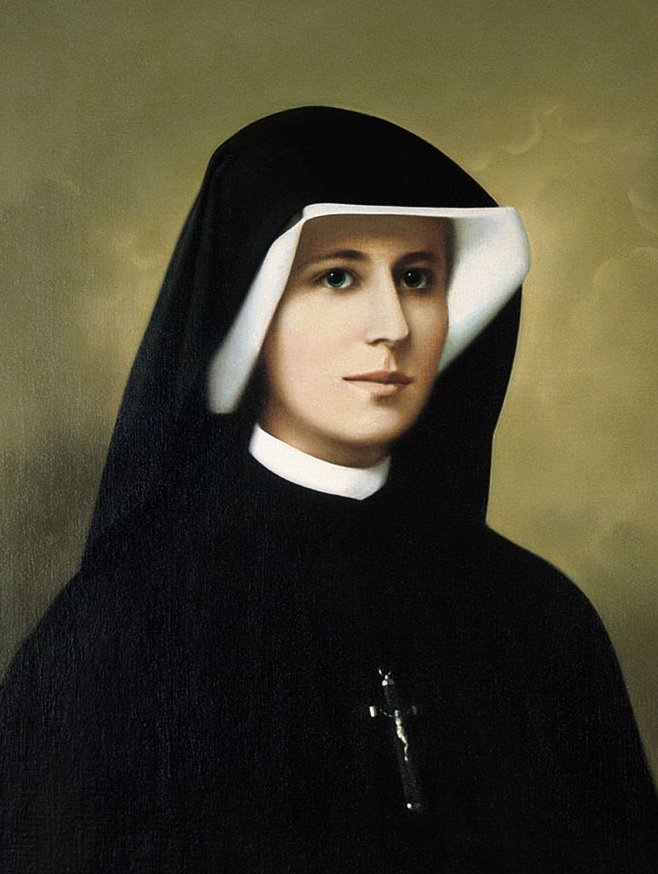

Virgin
- Born: 25 August 1905; Głogowiec, Łęczyca County, Congress Poland, Russian Empire
- Died: 5 October 1938 (aged 33); Kraków, Second Polish Republic
- Venerated in: Catholic Church
- Beatified: 18 April 1993, St. Peter's Square, Vatican City by Pope John Paul II
- Canonized: 30 April 2000, St. Peter's Square, Vatican City by Pope John Paul II
- Major shrine: Basilica of Divine Mercy, Kraków, Poland
- Feast: 5 October

Maria Faustyna Kowalska of the Blessed Sacrament, OLM (born Helena Kowalska; 25 August 1905 – 5 October 1938) was a Polish Catholic religious sister and mystic. Faustyna, popularly spelled Faustina in English, had apparitions of Jesus Christ which inspired the Catholic devotion to the Divine Mercy, therefore she is sometimes called the "secretary" of Divine Mercy.

Throughout her life, Kowalska reported having visions of Jesus and conversations with him, which she noted in her diary, later published as The Diary of Saint Maria Faustina Kowalska: Divine Mercy in My Soul. Her biography, submitted to the Congregation for the Causes of Saints, quoted some of the conversations with Jesus regarding the Divine Mercy devotion.

At the age of 20 years, she joined a convent in Warsaw. She was later transferred to Płock and then to Vilnius, where she met Father Michał Sopoćko, who was to be her confessor and spiritual director, and who supported her devotion to the Divine Mercy. With this priest's help, Kowalska commissioned an artist to paint the first Divine Mercy image, based on her vision of Jesus. Father Sopoćko celebrated Mass in the presence of this painting on Low Sunday, also known as the Second Sunday of Easter or (as established by Pope John Paul II), Divine Mercy Sunday.

The Catholic Church canonized Kowalska as a saint on 30 April 2000. The mystic is classified in the liturgy as a virgin and is venerated within the church as the "Apostle of Divine Mercy". Her tomb is in the Divine Mercy Sanctuary, Kraków, where she spent the end of her life and met confessor Józef Andrasz, who also supported the message of mercy.

== Early life ==
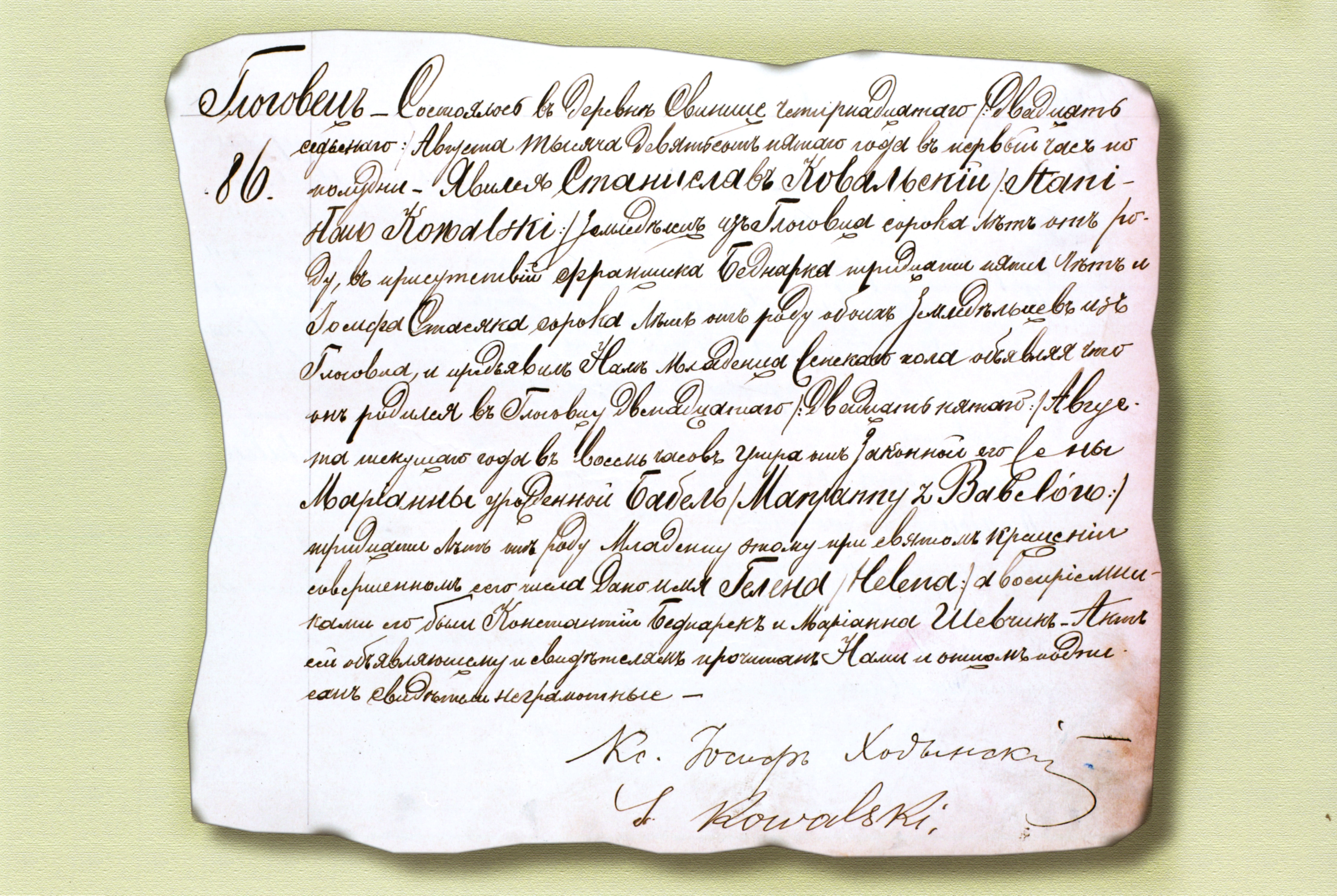
The registered birth certificate of Helena Kowalska

She was born Helena Kowalska on 25 August 1905 in Głogowiec, Łęczyca County, northwest of Łódź, in Poland. She was the third of ten children of Stanisław Kowalski and Marianna Kowalska. Her father was a carpenter and a peasant, and the family was poor and religious.

She later stated that she first felt a calling to the religious life while she attended the Exposition of the Blessed Sacrament at the age of seven. She wanted to enter the convent after she had completed her time at school, but her parents would not give her permission. When she was 16, she went to work as a housekeeper, first in Aleksandrów Łódzki, where she received the Sacrament of Confirmation, then in Łódź, to support herself and to help her parents.

== Entering a Warsaw convent ==
In 1924, at the age of 18 and a half, Kowalska went with her sister Natalia to a dance in a park in Łódź. Kowalska said that at the dance, she had a vision of a suffering Jesus, who she believed asked her: "How long shall I put up with you and how long will you keep putting Me off?" She then went to the Łódź Cathedral, where, as she later said, Jesus instructed her to depart for Warsaw immediately and to enter a convent. She took a train for Warsaw, some 85 miles (137 km) away, without asking her parents' permission and despite the fact that she knew nobody in Warsaw. The only belongings she took were the dress that she was wearing.

In 1925, Kowalska worked as a housemaid to save the money she needed, making deposits at the convent throughout the year and was finally accepted, as the Mother Superior had promised. On 30 April 1926, at the age of 20 years, she was clothed in the habit and received the religious name Maria Faustina of the Blessed Sacrament. Richard Torretto sees it as the feminine form of the name of a Roman martyr Faustinus, who was killed in AD 120. In April 1928, having completed the novitiate, she took her first religious vows as a nun, with her parents attending the rite.

From February to April 1929, she was posted to the convent in Vilnius, then in Poland, and now the capital of Lithuania, where she served as a cook. Although her first posting to Vilnius was short, she returned there later and met the priest Michael Sopoćko, who supported her mission. A year after her first return from Vilnius, in May 1930, she was transferred to the convent in Płock, Poland, for almost two years.

== Life as nun ==
=== Płock and Divine Mercy image ===
Kowalska arrived in Płock in May 1930. That year, the first signs of her illness, which was later thought to be tuberculosis, appeared, and she was sent to rest for several months in a nearby farm owned by her congregation. After her recovery, she returned to the convent, and by February 1931, she had been in the Płock area for about nine months.

Kowalska wrote that on the night of Sunday, 22 February 1931, while she was in her cell in Płock, Jesus appeared wearing a white garment with red and pale rays emanating from his heart. In her diary (Notebook I, Items 47 and 48), she wrote that Jesus told her:

Paint an image according to the pattern you see, with the signature: "Jesus, I trust in You" (in Polish: "Jezu, ufam Tobie"). I desire that this image be venerated, first in your chapel, and then throughout the world. I promise that the soul that will venerate this image will not perish.

Not knowing how to paint, Kowalska approached some other nuns at the convent in Płock for help, but she received no assistance. Three years later, after her assignment to Vilnius, the first artistic rendering of the image was produced under her direction.

In the same 22 February 1931 message about the Divine Mercy image, as Kowalska also wrote in her diary (Notebook I, item 49), Jesus told her that he wanted the Divine Mercy image to be "solemnly blessed on the first Sunday after Easter Sunday; that Sunday is to be the Feast of Mercy."

In November 1932, Kowalska returned to Warsaw to prepare to take her final vows as a nun, by which she would become in perpetuity a sister of Our Lady of Mercy. The ceremony took place on 1 May 1933, in Łagiewniki.

=== Vilnius and meeting Sopoćko ===
In late May 1933, Kowalska was transferred to Vilnius to work as the gardener; her tasks included growing vegetables. She remained in Vilnius for about three years, until March 1936. The convent in Vilnius then had only 18 sisters and was housed in a few scattered small houses, rather than a large building.

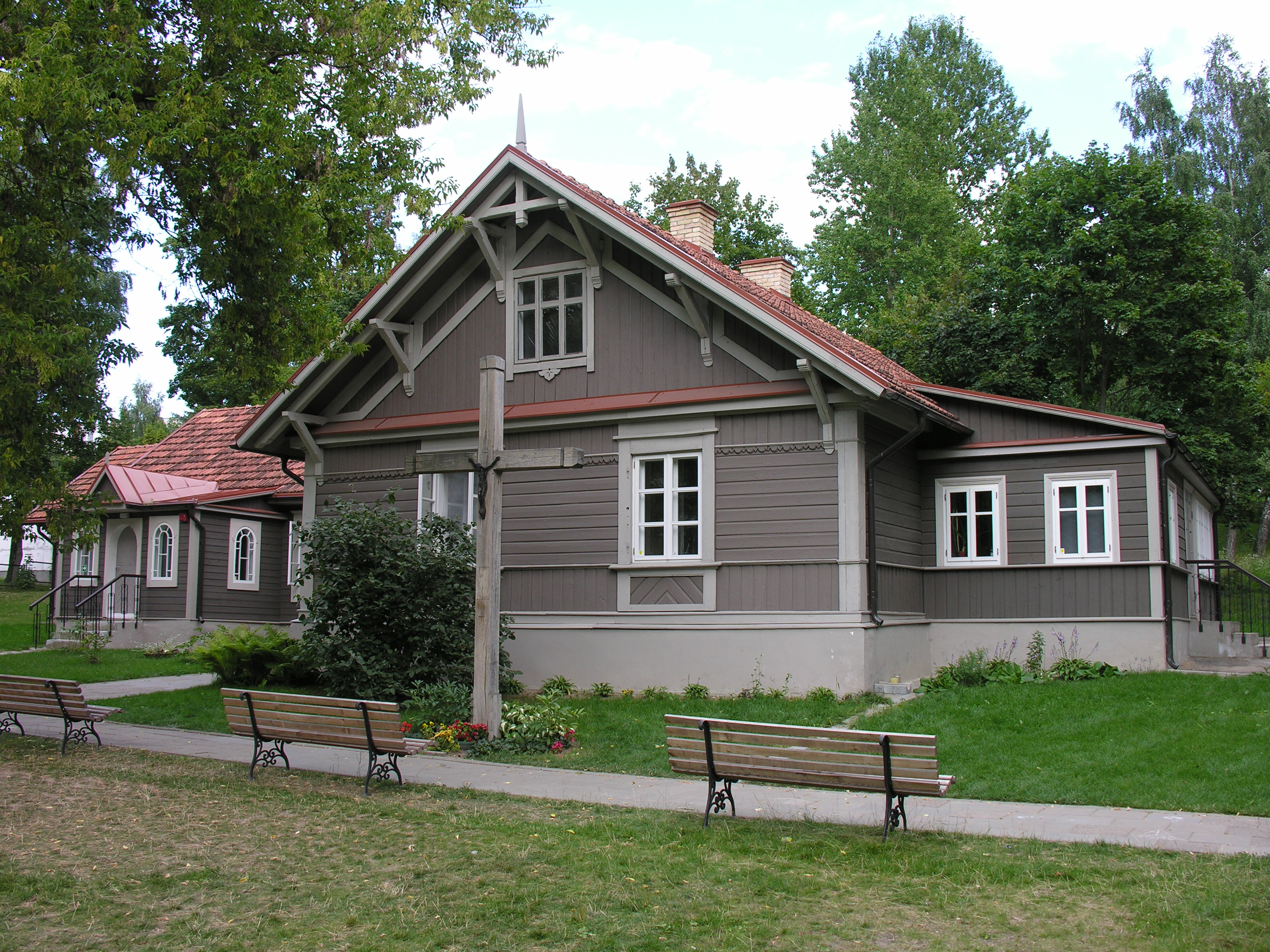
The small convent building where Kowalska lived in Vilnius

Shortly after arriving in Vilnius, Kowalska met the priest Michael Sopoćko, the newly appointed confessor to the nuns. He was also a professor of pastoral theology at Stefan Batory University, now called Vilnius University.

When Kowalska went for the first time to this priest for confession, she told him that she had been conversing with Jesus, who had a plan for her. After some time, Sopoćko insisted on a complete psychiatric evaluation of Kowalska by Helena Maciejewska, a psychiatrist and a physician associated with the convent. This took place in 1933 and Kowalska passed the required tests and was declared of sound mind.

Sopoćko then began to have confidence in Kowalska and supported her efforts. Kowalska told Sopoćko about the Divine Mercy image, and in January 1934, Sopoćko introduced her to the artist Eugene Kazimierowski, who was also a professor at the university.

By June 1934, Kazimierowski had finished painting the image, based on the direction of Kowalska and Sopoćko, the only Divine Mercy painting that Kowalska saw. According to Catholic author Urszula Gregorczyk, a superimposition of the face of Jesus in the Image of the Divine Mercy upon that in the already-famous Shroud of Turin shows great similarity.

Kowalska wrote in her diary (Notebook I, Item 414) that on Good Friday, 19 April 1935, Jesus told her that he wanted the Divine Mercy image to be publicly honoured. A week later, on 26 April 1935, Sopoćko delivered the first sermon ever on the Divine Mercy, and Kowalska attended the sermon.

The first Mass during which the Divine Mercy image was displayed occurred on 28 April 1935, the second Sunday of Easter, and was attended by Kowalska. It was also the celebration of the end of the Jubilee of the Redemption by Pope Pius XI.

On 13 and 14 September 1935, while still in Vilnius, Kowalska wrote of two visions about the Chaplet of Divine Mercy in her diary (Notebook I, Items 474 to 476). According to her, the chaplet prayers and structure were dictated to her directly by Jesus Christ, who granted several promises to its recitation. The chaplet is about a third of the length of the Rosary. Kowalska wrote that the purpose for the chaplet's prayers for mercy is threefold: to obtain mercy, to trust in Christ's mercy, and to show mercy to others.

In November 1935, Kowalska wrote the rules for a new contemplative religious congregation devoted to the Divine Mercy. In December, she visited a house in Vilnius that she said she had seen in a vision as the first convent for the congregation.

In January 1936, Kowalska went to see Jałbrzykowski to discuss a new congregation for Divine Mercy. However, he reminded her that she was perpetually vowed to her current congregation. In March 1936, Kowalska told her superiors that she was thinking of leaving the congregation to start a new one that was specifically devoted to Divine Mercy, but she was transferred to Walendów, southwest of Warsaw. She reported that Jesus had said to her: "My Daughter, do whatever is within your power to spread devotion to My Divine Mercy, I will make up for what you lack."

=== Kraków and final years ===
In 1936, Sopoćko wrote the first brochure on the Divine Mercy devotion, and Jałbrzykowski provided his imprimatur for it. The brochure carried the Divine Mercy image on the cover. Sopoćko sent copies of the brochure to Kowalska in Warsaw. Eventually he became the main promoter of her revelations.

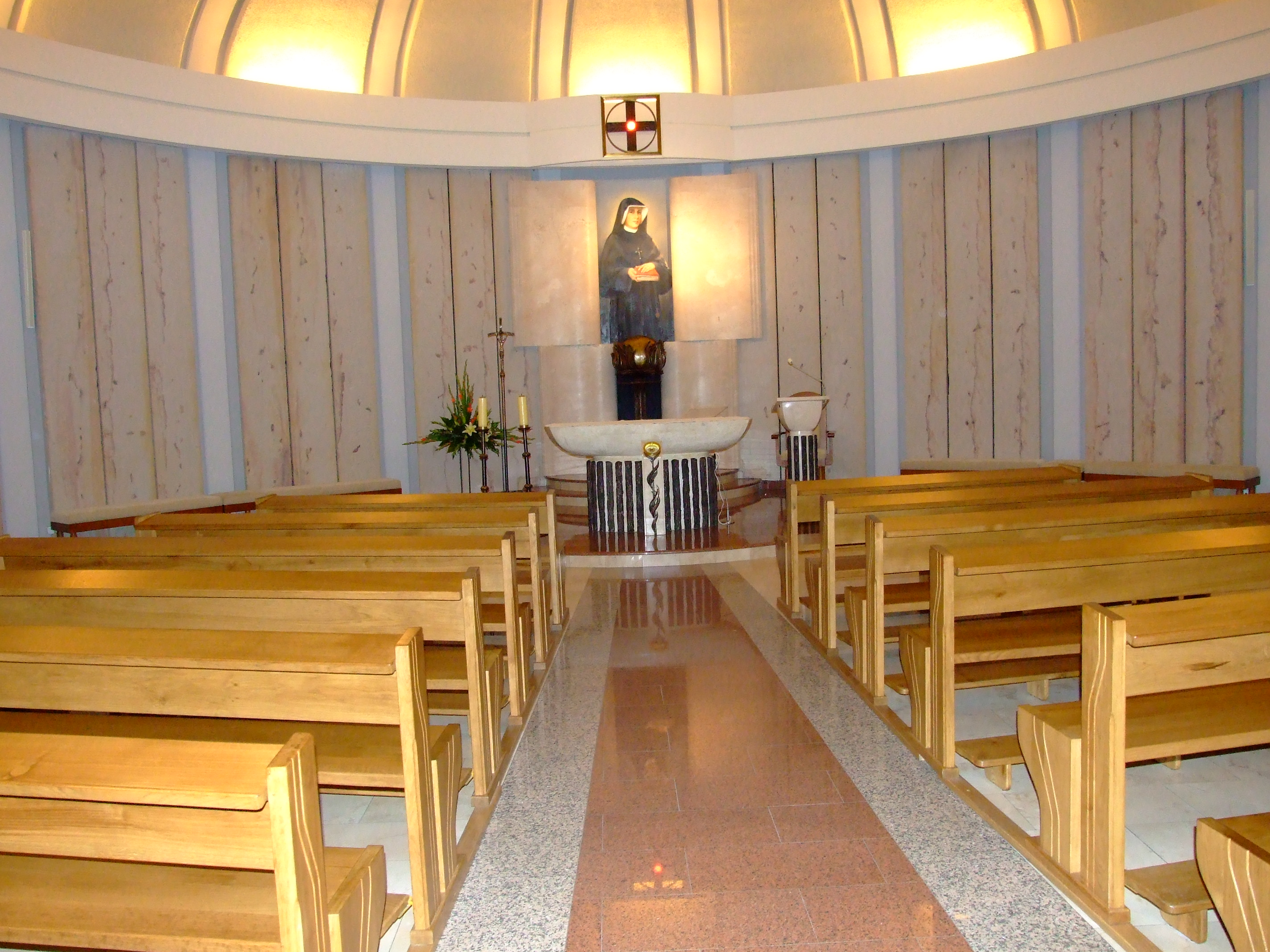
Chapel of Saint Faustina Kowalska at her resting place, the Basilica of Divine Mercy in Kraków, Łagiewniki

Later in 1936, Kowalska became ill with what has since been speculated to be tuberculosis. She was moved to the sanatorium in Prądnik, Kraków. She continued to spend much time in prayer in reciting the chaplet and praying for the conversion of sinners. The last two years of her life were spent praying and keeping her diary.

On 23 March 1937, Kowalska wrote in her diary (Notebook III, Item 1044) that she had a vision that the feast of the Divine Mercy would be celebrated in her local chapel and would be attended by large crowds and also that the same celebration would be held in Rome, attended by the pope.

In July 1937, the first holy cards with the Divine Mercy image were printed. In August, Sopoćko asked Kowalska to write the instructions for the Novena of Divine Mercy, which she had reported as a message from Jesus on Good Friday 1937.

Throughout 1937, progress was made in promoting the Divine Mercy, and in November 1937, a pamphlet was published with the title Christ, King of Mercy. The pamphlet included the chaplet, the novena and the litany of the Divine Mercy. The Divine Mercy image appeared on the cover, with the signature "Jesus I Trust in You". On 10 November 1937, Mother Irene, Kowalska's superior, showed her the booklets while Kowalska rested in her bed.

As her health deteriorated at the end of 1937, Kowalska's reported visions intensified, and she was said to be looking forward to an end to her life. In April 1938, her illness had progressed, and she was sent to rest in the sanatorium in Prądnik for what was to be her final stay there.

In September 1938, Sopoćko visited her at the sanatorium and found her very ill but in ecstasy, as she was praying. Later that month, she was taken back home to Kraków to await her death there. Sopoćko visited her at the convent for the last time on 26 September 1938.

Kowalska died at the age of 33, on 5 October 1938, in Kraków. She was buried on 7 October and now rests at Kraków's Basilica of Divine Mercy.

== Diary: Divine Mercy in My Soul ==
Diary: Divine Mercy in My Soul was written by Kowalska. The book is based on the contents of her diary from 1925 until her death in 1938.

It was while assigned to Vilnius that Kowalska was advised by her confessor, Michael Sopoćko, to keep a diary and record her apparitions. Kowalska's diary is the only mystical text composed in Polish.

The handwritten pages of Kowalska's diary turned into about 700 printed pages, published as the book Diary: Divine Mercy in My Soul. It reflects her thoughts, prayers and reported visions and conversations with Jesus on divine mercy. Kowalska's Vatican biography quotes some of her reported conversations with Jesus from her diary.

In March 1959, the Holy Office issued a notification, signed by Hugh O'Flaherty as notary, that forbade circulation of "images and writings that promote devotion to Divine Mercy in the forms proposed by Sister Faustina" (emphasis in the original). It is claimed the negative judgement of the Holy Office was based on misunderstanding due to the latter's use of a faulty French or Italian translation of the diary. However, at the time, the ban was due to "serious theological reservations and what Vatican evaluators felt to be an excessive focus on Kowalska herself."

The ban and the placement of her work on the Forbidden Index remained in place for almost two decades, but was reversed in 1978. On 15 April 1978, the Congregation for the Doctrine of the Faith issued a new notification that rescinded the previous one and reversed the ban on circulation of Kowalska's work. It decreed: "This Sacred Congregation, in view of the many original documents that were unknown in 1959, giving consideration to the profoundly changed circumstances, and taking into account the view of many Polish ordinaries, declares no longer binding the prohibitions contained in the cited 'notification'".

== Devotion to Divine Mercy ==
Before her death, Kowalska predicted that "there will be a war, a terrible, terrible war" and asked the nuns to pray for Poland. In 1939, a year after Kowalska's death, Romuald Jałbrzykowski noticed that her predictions about the war had taken place and allowed public access to the Divine Mercy image, which resulted in large crowds that led to the spread of the Divine Mercy devotion. The devotion became a source of strength and inspiration for many people in Poland. By 1941, the devotion had reached the United States, and millions of copies of Divine Mercy prayer cards had been printed and distributed worldwide.

In 1942, Jałbrzykowski was arrested by the Nazis, and Sopoćko and other professors went into hiding near Vilnius for about two years. During that period, Sopoćko used his time to prepare for the establishment of a new religious congregation, based on the Divine Mercy messages reported by Kowalska. After the war, Sopoćko wrote the constitution for the congregation and helped the formation of what is now the Congregation of the Sisters of the Divine Mercy. By 1951, thirteen years after Kowalska's death, there were 150 Divine Mercy centers in Poland.

On 24 June 1956, Pope Pius XII blessed an Image of the Divine Mercy in Rome, the only one blessed by a pope before the Second Vatican Council. In 1955, under Pope Pius XII, the Bishop of Gorzów founded the Congregation of the Most Holy Lord Jesus Christ, Merciful Redeemer, to spread devotion to the Divine Mercy. Under both Pope Pius XI and Pope Pius XII, writings on devotion to the Divine Mercy were given imprimaturs by many bishops, making it an approved devotion. Cardinals Adam Stefan Sapieha and August Hlond were among those who gave their approval. During the papacy of Pius XII, Vatican Radio broadcast several times about the Divine Mercy.

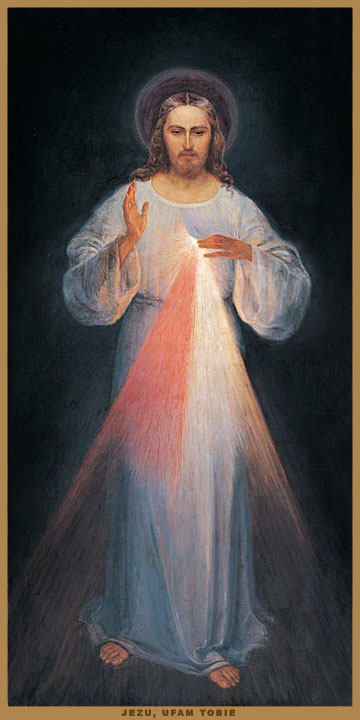
The original image of the Divine Mercy, painted under the guidance of Faustina Kowalska

Archbishop Karol Wojtyła later became Pope John Paul II and beatified and canonized Kowalska. On 30 April 2000, Pope John Paul II proclaimed the Second Sunday of Easter as the Divine Mercy Sunday, which is the Sunday after Easter Sunday. In 2002, the Pope established that the Divine Mercy Sunday should be enriched with indulgences. That same year, he also consecrated the world to Jesus of Divine Mercy at the Divine Mercy Sanctuary in Kraków. He died in April 2005, on the eve of Divine Mercy Sunday, and was himself beatified by his successor, Pope Benedict XVI, on Divine Mercy Sunday, 1 May 2011, and was canonized by Pope Francis on Divine Mercy Sunday, 27 April 2014.

=== Sainthood ===
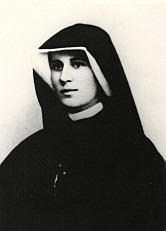
Faustyna Kowalska

In 1965, with the approval of the Holy Office, Karol Wojtyła, then Archbishop of Kraków and later Pope John Paul II, opened the initial informative process into Kowalska's life and virtues, interviewed witnesses and, in 1967, submitted a number of documents about Kowalska to the Vatican and requested the start of the official process of her beatification. That was begun in 1968 and concluded with her beatification on 18 April 1993. She was canonised on 30 April 2000, and her feast day is 5 October.

The Holy See's Press Office biography provided on the occasion of her canonization quotes some of her reputed conversations with Jesus. The author and priest Benedict Groeschel considers a modest estimate of the following of the Divine Mercy devotion in 2010 to be over 100 million Catholics. Pope John Paul II said, "The message she brought is the appropriate and incisive answer that God wanted to offer to the questions and expectations of human beings in our time, marked by terrible tragedies. Jesus said to Sr. Faustina one day: 'Humanity will never find peace until it turns with trust to the Divine Mercy.'"

In October 2011, a group of cardinals and bishops sent a petition to Pope Benedict XVI for Kowalska to be made a Doctor of the Church.

On the 100th anniversary of the birth of Pope John Paul II, 18 May 2020, Kowalska was added by Pope Francis to the General Roman Calendar as an optional memorial.

Palmarian Pope Gregory XVII canonized Kowalska with a feast day on the first Sunday after Easter.

=== Miracles ===
The formal beatification of Kowalska involved the case of Maureen Digan of Massachusetts. In March 1981, Digan reported a healing while she was praying at the tomb of Kowalska. Digan had suffered from lymphedema for decades, a disease that causes significant swelling from fluid retention, and had undergone ten operations, including a leg amputation. Digan reported that while she prayed at Kowalska's tomb, she heard a voice saying "ask for my help and I will help you", and her constant pain stopped. After two days, Digan reported that her foot, which had previously been too large for her shoe because of her body's liquid retention, was healed. Upon her return to the United States, five Boston-area physicians confirmed that she was healed, and the case was declared miraculous by the Vatican in 1992, based on the additional testimony of over 20 witnesses about her prior condition.

The miracle that led to the canonization of Kowalska was the case of Ronald Pytel, a priest from Baltimore. In 1995, Ronald was diagnosed with an aortic valve constriction and a damaged left ventricule of his heart. On 5 October 1995, the feast day of the Blessed Faustina, Ronald Pytel allegedly collapsed consciously and was paralyzed while venerating a relic of Kowalska at the Holy Rosary Church in Baltimore. At the same time, a group was praying for his healing through her intercession in the church. On 9 November 1995, an examination by his cardiologist reportedly showed a complete healing of his heart. On 16 November 1999, after three years of examination of his case by doctors, the Congregation for the Causes of Saints declared that there was no medical explanation for the instant cure of his heart. On 9 December 1999, a Vatican theological committee confirmed the attribution of the miracle to the intercession of Blessed Faustina. On 20 December 1999, this decree was promulgated in the presence of the Pope John Paul II.

== In art ==
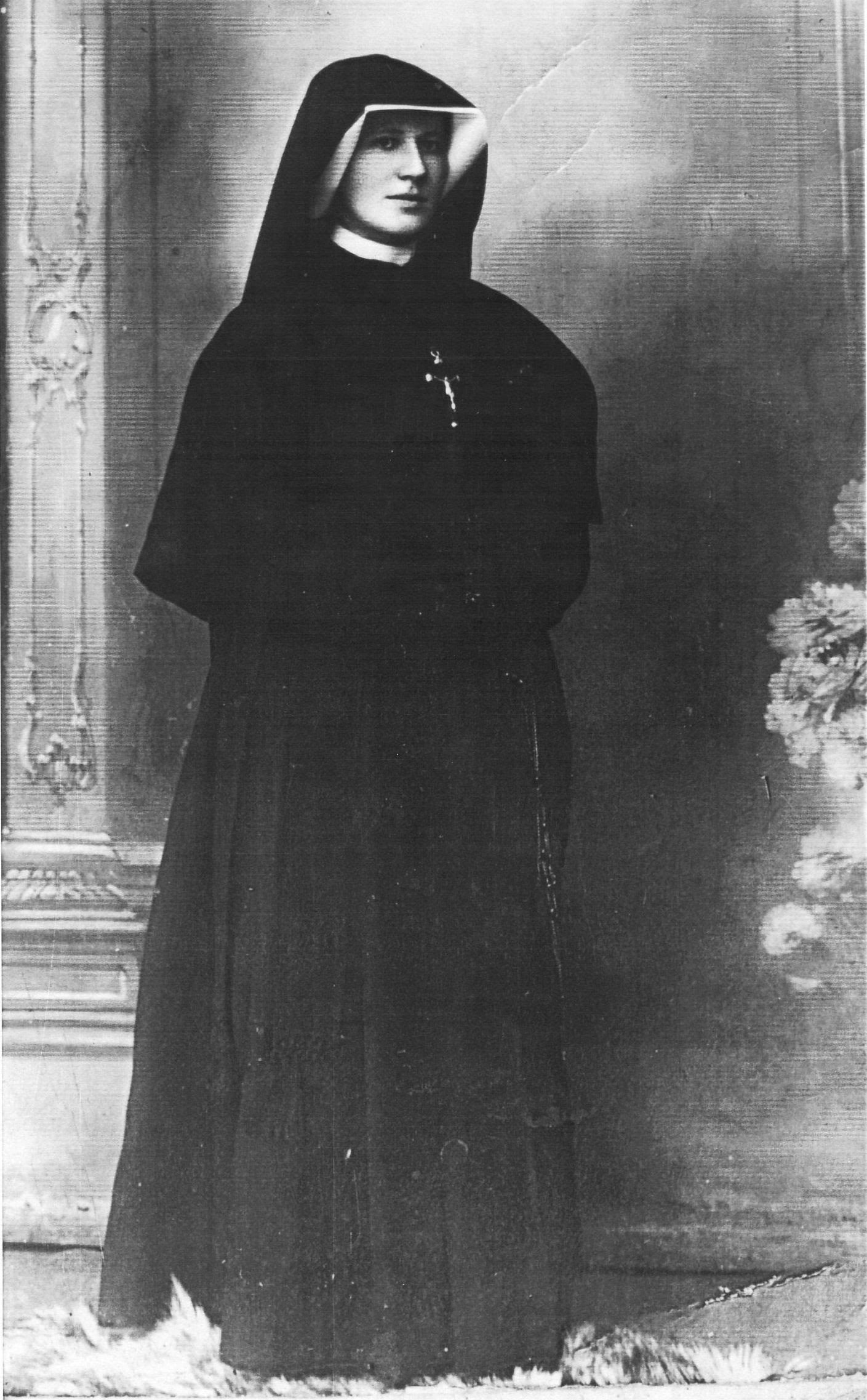
Photograph of Saint Faustina (1931)

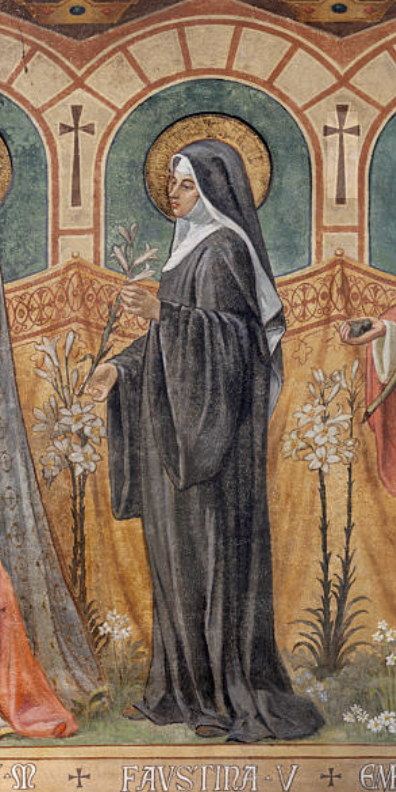
Eugenio Cisterna, fresco of Saints Agnes, Faustina and Emerentiana (detail) (20th c.)

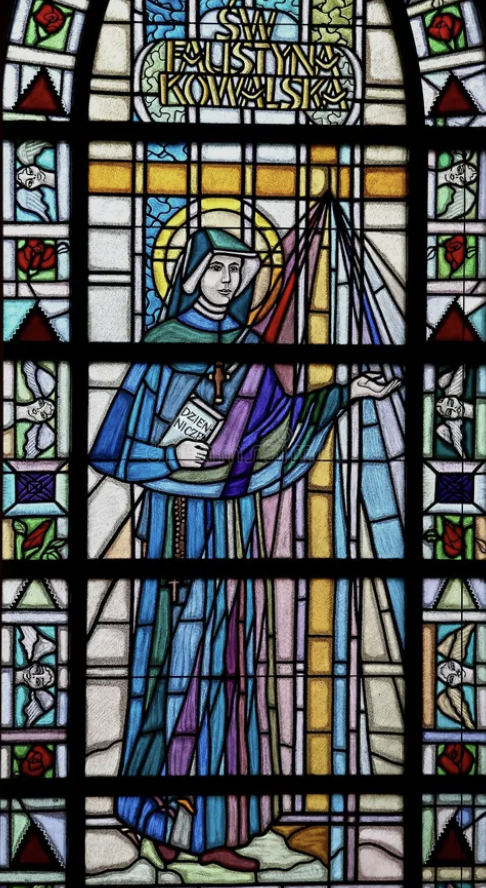
stained glass window of St. Faustina (20th–21st c.)

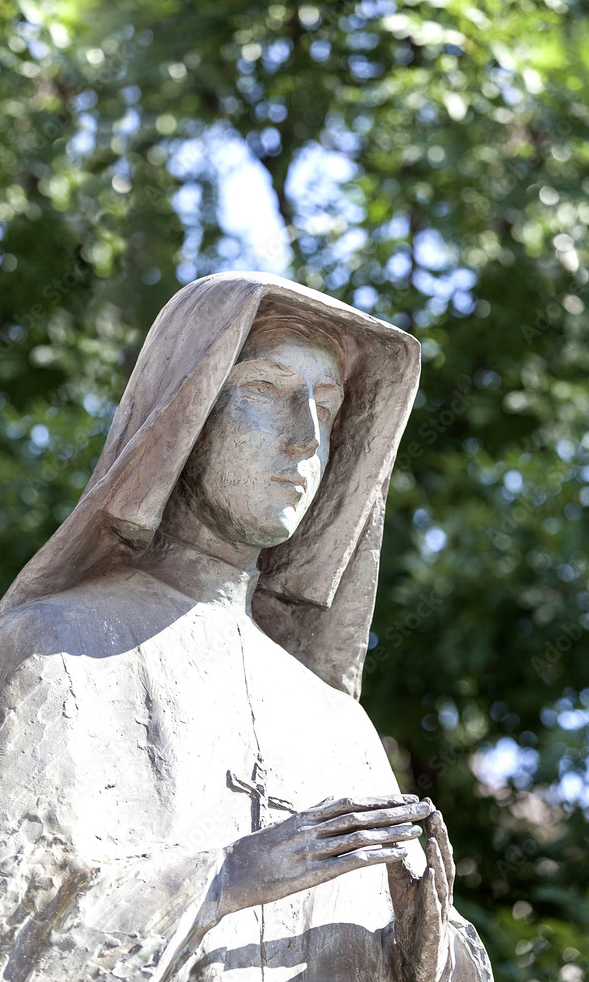
Statue of Saint Faustina (20th–21st c.)

== Films ==
- Divine Mercy: No Escape (United States, 1987)
- Divine Mercy: Sa Buhay ni Sister Faustina ("In the Life of Sister Faustina"; Philippines, 1993)
- Faustina (Poland, 1995)
- The Last Appeal: The Life of Faustina The Apostle of Divine Mercy (2009)
- Love and Mercy: Faustina (Poland, 2019)

== See also ==
- Saint Faustina, patron saint archive

== Sources ==
- Drake, Tim (2002). Saints of the Jubilee. AuthorHouse. ISBN 978-1-4033-1009-5.
- Guiley, Rosemary Ellen (2001). The Encyclopedia of Saints. Facts on File. ISBN 0-8160-4134-2.
- Kowalska, Faustina. 2020. Diary: Divine mercy in my soul. Krakow: Misericordia. Online at <https://www.faustyna.pl>. Diary: Divine mercy in My Soul. The Diary of Saint Maria Faustina Kowalska, 2003. ISBN 1-59614-110-7
- Torretto, Richard (2010). A Divine Mercy Resource. iUniverse. ISBN 978-1-4502-3236-4.
- Vatican biography of Faustina Kowalska
