= Chaplet of the Divine Mercy =

Catholic devotion

The Chaplet of the Divine Mercy, also called the Divine Mercy Chaplet, is a Catholic devotion to the Divine Mercy, based on the Christological apparitions of Jesus Christ reported by Faustina Kowalska (1905–1938), known as "the Apostle of Mercy". She was a Polish religious sister of the Congregation of the Sisters of Our Lady of Mercy and was canonized as a Catholic saint in 2000 by Pope John Paul II.

Kowalska stated that she received this rosary-based prayer directly from Jesus through visions and conversations, who also made specific promises regarding the recitation of the prayer. Her Vatican biography quotes some of these conversations.

This chaplet is prayed with the same set of rosary beads used for reciting the Marian Rosary. As an Anglican devotion, the Divine Mercy Society of the Anglican Church states that the chaplet can also be recited on Anglican prayer beads. The chaplet may also be said without beads, by counting prayers on the fingertips, and can be accompanied by the veneration of the Divine Mercy image.

== History ==
Kowalska wrote about the revelations of Jesus regarding the chaplet in her diary (Diary 474-476) during her stay in Vilnius on 13 and 14 September 1935. Kowalska recounted a vision in which she saw an angel of divine wrath sent to punish the earth for its sins. In response, Kowalska began praying for the angel to delay its punishment and for the world to repent. While she was praying for this, she suddenly had a vision of the Holy Trinity and was taken before the Throne of God. Overwhelmed by its majesty, she did not dare to repeat her prayers. However, she felt a power from Jesus in her soul and heard internally two new prayers: "The Eternal Father" and "For the sake of His sorrowful Passion". As she was moved to pray these prayers, the angel became powerless and unable to perform the punishment. The next day, on 14 September 1935, as she entered a chapel, she again heard Jesus dictating the same prayers to her and the structure of a new chaplet based on them.

Kowalska stated that Jesus asked her to pray this chaplet and instruct others to do so. She learned that the prayers were to be taught to all the people of the world. Although the chaplet is said on beads like the Rosary, it is about a third of the length of the Rosary, and unlike the Rosary that has evolved over the years, the form and structure of the chaplet has remained unchanged since Kowalska attributed it to a message from Jesus. According to Kowalska's visions, written in her diary, the chaplet's prayers for mercy are threefold: to obtain mercy, to trust in Christ's mercy, and to show mercy to others.

On November 19, 1958, and reaffirmed in 1959, the Vatican banned the Chaplet and its promulgation. Some Polish bishops questioned Kowalska's claims and were uncomfortable with the image's similarity to the red-and-white Polish flag. Polish priests were reported to be interpreting the rays as a symbol of the flag.

The ban on devotion was lifted on 15 April 1978, due to pressure from future Polish pope Karol Wojtyła, who had great interest in Kowalska. After assuming the throne of Peter, John Paul II was instrumental in the formal establishment of the Divine Mercy devotion and acknowledged the efforts of the Marian Fathers in its promotion in a Papal Blessing in 2001, on the 70th anniversary of the revelation of the Divine Mercy Message and Devotion.

Although the Chaplet of Divine Mercy and the Chaplet of Holy Wounds share similarities, these are distinct chaplets and were introduced over 20 years apart, one in Poland, the other in France.

== Promises ==
Kowalska wrote that Jesus promised great mercy to all who recite this chaplet, both during their lifetime and especially at the hour of death. She also noted that some graces could be granted to the dying if others pray the chaplet at their bedside. She recorded Jesus saying :

“Whoever will recite it will receive great mercy at the hour of death.” (Diary 687)

"Even if there were a sinner most hardened, if he were to recite this chaplet only once, he would receive grace from My infinite mercy... I desire to grant unimaginable graces to those souls who trust in My mercy.” (Diary 687)

"The souls that say this chaplet will be embraced by My mercy during their lifetime and especially at the hour of their death." (Diary 754)

"I shall treat every soul that says this Chaplet as My glory, and I shall grant it My defence at the hour of death; also those at whose deathbed others say the Chaplet shall be granted the same indulgence. When people say the Chaplet at a dying person’s bedside, God’s anger is placated, and unfathomed mercy embraces the soul " (Diary 811)

“When they say this chaplet in the presence of the dying, I will stand between My Father and the dying person, not as a just Judge but as a merciful Savior.” (Diary 1541)

“When hardened sinners say it, I will fill their souls with peace, and the hour of their death will be a happy one.” (Diary 1541)

According to her diary, she sometimes had sudden visions of certain souls dying and she was then asked by Jesus to pray the chaplet in order to obtain for them mercy and be saved through the prayer.

Kowalska also stated that Jesus promised that anything can be obtained with this prayer if it is compatible with his will.

“When they say this Chaplet, it will please Me to grant everything they shall ask for” (Diary 1541)

“Through this chaplet, you will obtain everything, if what you ask for is compatible with My will.” (Diary 1731)

== Practice ==
According to Roman Catholic tradition, the chaplet may be said at any time, but it is often said on Divine Mercy Sunday, as part of a novena that starts on Good Friday or on Fridays at 3:00 p.m..

The chaplet is prayed daily at the National Shrine of The Divine Mercy in Stockbridge, Massachusetts and on the National Shrine in Krakow and Vilnius respectively at the shared time.

In the Philippines, the opening portion of the chaplet known as the "3 O'Clock Habit" (Filipino: Panalangin Para Sa Ikatlo/Alas-Tres Ng Hapon) is broadcast on radio stations and television networks (Note: Some radio and television stations (with the exception of ABS-CBN television network and ABS-CBN's DZMM radio station) dropped the practice in 1990s and 2000s, but it is currently only shown on ABS-CBN's Kapamilya Channel.) daily at 3:00 p.m., beginning June 16, 1985. In 2000, Pope John Paul II ordained the Sunday after Easter as the Divine Mercy Sunday, where Roman Catholics remember the institution of the Sacrament of Penance. The hour Jesus died by crucifixion, 3:00 p.m., is called the Hour of Mercy. In a novena, the chaplet is usually said each of the nine days from Good Friday to Divine Mercy Sunday.

== Chaplet ==
=== Prayers ===
The chaplet contains several unique prayers. It is prayed on ordinary Rosary beads.

Jesus gave very careful instructions about how to pray the Chaplet: Diary entry 476:

The next morning, when I entered chapel, I heard these words interiorly: Every time you enter the chapel, immediately recite the prayer which I taught you yesterday. When I had said the prayer, in my soul I heard these words: This prayer will serve to appease My wrath. You will recite it for nine days, on the beads of the rosary, in the following manner: First of all, you will say one OUR FATHER and HAIL MARY and the I BELIEVE IN GOD. Then on the OUR FATHER beads you will say the following words: “Eternal Father, I offer You the Body and Blood, Soul and divinity of Your dearly beloved Son, Our Lord Jesus Christ, in atonement for our sins and those of the whole world.” On the HAIL MARY beads you will say the following words: “For the sake of His sorrowful Passion have mercy on us and on the whole world.” In conclusion, three times you will recite these words: “Holy God, Holy Mighty One, Holy Immortal One, have mercy on us and on the whole world.”

The Prayers are as follows: The Sign of the Cross, followed by The Apostles'Creed, the Our Father, and the Hail Mary.

Then:

==== Eternal Father ====
The Eternal Father prayer opens each decade of the chaplet and is prayed on the single beads separating the decades where the Our Father is normally prayed:

Eternal Father, I offer you the Body and Blood, Soul and Divinity of Your Dearly Beloved Son, Our Lord, Jesus Christ, in atonement for our sins and those of the whole world.

==== For the sake of His sorrowful Passion ====
The "For the sake of His sorrowful Passion" prayer, repeated 10 times in succession, forms the body of each decade of the chaplet, using the beads where the Hail Marys are normally recited:

For the sake of His sorrowful Passion, have mercy on us and on the whole world.

==== Holy God (Trisagion) ====
The Holy God or Trisagion prayer, repeated three times in succession, concludes the chaplet, recited where the Hail Holy Queen is normally prayed:

Holy God, Holy Mighty One, Holy Immortal One, have mercy on us and on the whole world.

The Sign of the Cross

=== Structure ===
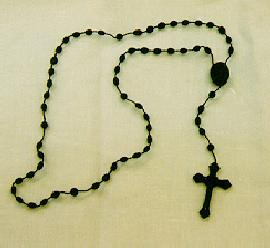
The chaplet is often recited on beads as a rosary-based prayer.

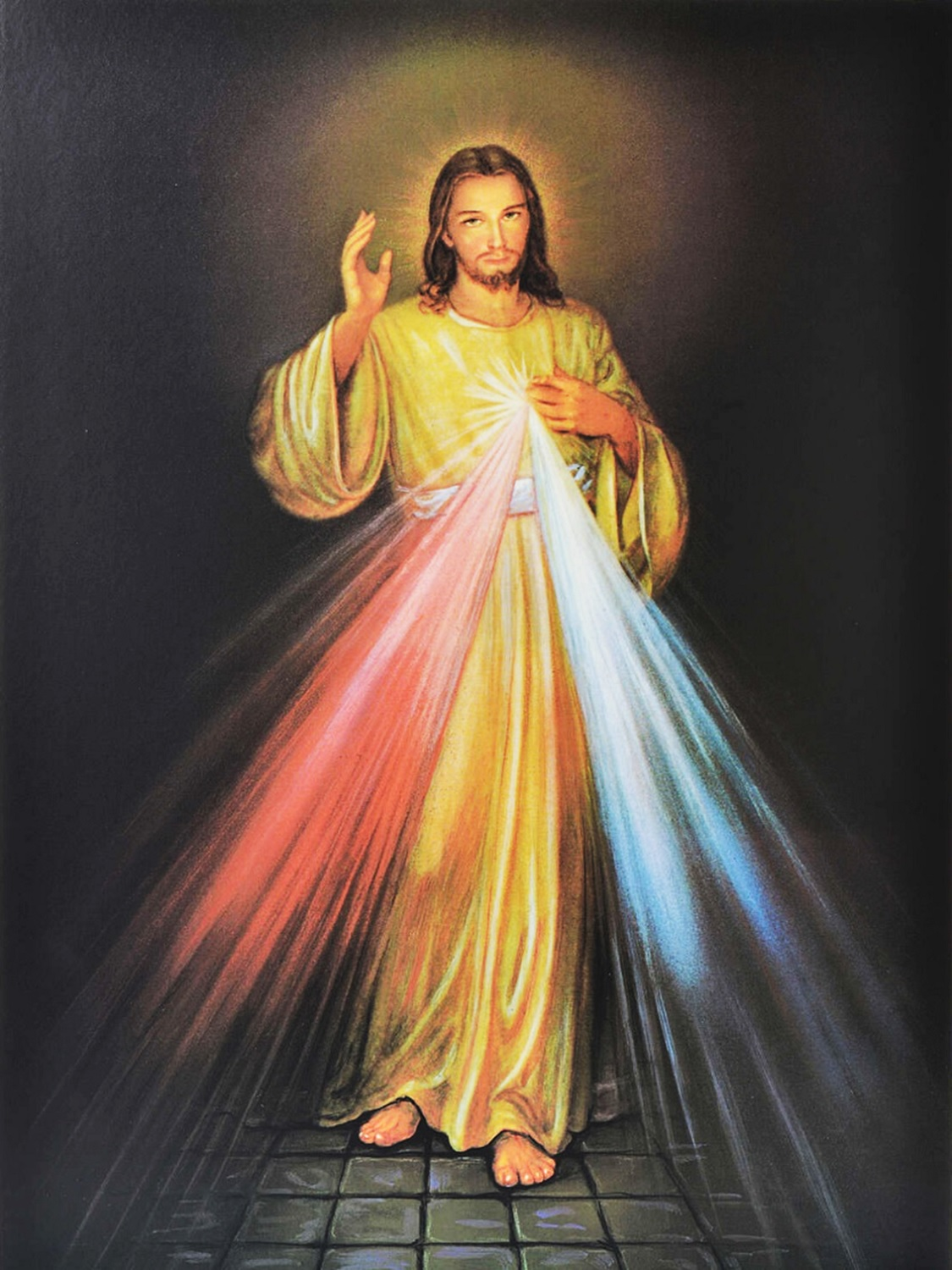
The Divine Mercy image devoted with the Chaplet

The chaplet is prayed on ordinary rosary beads that are also used to pray the Dominican Rosary.

However, according to the Congregation of the Sisters of Our Lady of Mercy, the chaplet should not be prayed the same way as an ordinary rosary: the decades should not be interspersed with meditations, intentions or any other prayers. Any intentions or texts are to be meditated upon at the beginning so that the entire prayer is said the way Jesus dictated it.

The structure of the chaplet is as follows:

The chaplet is begun on the short strand of the rosary beads:

- The sign of the cross on the Crucifix;
- The Lord's Prayer on the first small bead;
- The Hail Mary on the second small bead; and
- The Apostles' Creed on the third small bead.

The praying of the decades then follows, repeating this cycle for each:

- The Eternal Father on the large bead; and
- The For the sake of His sorrowful Passion on each of the ten adjacent small beads, emphasizing the offering of the Body and Blood of Christ.

To conclude:

- The Holy God
- The sign of the cross.

=== Divine Mercy Novena ===
The Divine Mercy Chaplet may be repeated over a period of nine days as part of a novena. According to Kowalska's Diary, Jesus himself asked Faustina that the Divine Mercy Novena be prayed as a preparation for the Feast of the Divine Mercy, celebrated each year on first Sunday after Easter. The novena should begin on Good Friday.

"Jesus told me to say the Chaplet for nine days before the Feast of Mercy. It's to start on Good Friday. "Through this Novena, I shall grant all manner of graces to souls."" (Diary 796) "I desire that during these nine days you bring souls to the fountain of My mercy, that they may draw therefrom strength and refreshment and whatever grace they have need of in the hardships of life, and especially at the hour of death" (Diary 1209)

There is a prayer intention for specific group of people on each of the nine days.

"On each day of the novena you will bring to My heart a different group of souls and you will immerse them in this ocean of My mercy... On each day you will beg My Father, on the strength of My passion, for the graces for these souls." (Diary 1209)

The novena intentions for each day are:

1. All mankind, in particular, all sinners.
2. The souls of Catholic priests and religious.
3. All devout and faithful souls.
4. Those who do not believe in God and those who do not yet know him.
5. The souls of those separated from the Catholic Church.
6. Meek and humble of heart, and children.
7. People who especially venerate and glorify Christ's mercy.
8. The souls in Purgatory.
9. The souls of those who have become lukewarm.

== See also ==
- Divine Mercy (Catholic devotion)
- Divine Mercy Sunday
- Divine Mercy image
- Faustina Kowalska
- Works of mercy
