= Andrej Ablamiejka =

Belarusian Greek Catholic priest (born 1970)

Archpriest Andrej Paŭlavič Ablamiejka (Belarusian: Андрэй Паўлавіч Абламейка; born 30 April 1970, Minsk, Belarus) is a Belarusian Greek Catholic priest.

== Biography ==
Ablamiejka was born in a family of the technical intelligentsia. On 5 August 1971 he was baptized as Orthodox at Saint Peter and Paul Church in the Zhuhavichi village, near to Mir, Belarus. He studied at high school in Minsk. From 1984 to 1988 with well-known historians he participated in archaeological excavations. From 1988 he served in the Soviet Army. In 1989 Ablamiejka became a practicing Greek-Catholic, converting from Orthodoxy. In 1990 he began to prepare for admission to the seminary, in the same year participated in the organization of the first post-war Uniate parish in Minsk. In April 1991 he married Svetlana Butera. In May 1991 Yan Matusevich and Bishop Sophrone (Dmiterko), OSBM decided to ordain him as a deacon. In 1994 he studied at the Palacký University of Olomouc in Czech Republic, as well as in the Catholic University of Lublin, in Poland. In 1998 Ablamiejka returned to religious services in Belarus, serving in Belarusian Greek Catholic parishes of Maladzechna, Lida and Minsk. After the death of his father Ian Matusevich in December 1998, he was ordained to the priesthood by Ukrainian Catholic Archeparchy of Przemyśl–Warsaw, Archbishop Jan Martyniak in Lublin and was appointed rector of the parish of Saint Joseph in Minsk, as well as parish administrator in Lida and Maladzechna. From 1998 to 2009 he was a member of the Board of the Bible Society of the Republic of Belarus. Also, until 2009 he served as archpriest of the Central West Deanery of the Belarusian Greek Catholic Church and head of the secretariat of the apostolic visitator, Sergiusz Gajek. Father Ablamiejka now continues his theological education in Austria, where he lives with his wife and his son and two daughters, and serves to Belarusian Greek-Catholics in Prague.
