= Makryna Mieczysławska =

19th-century impostor

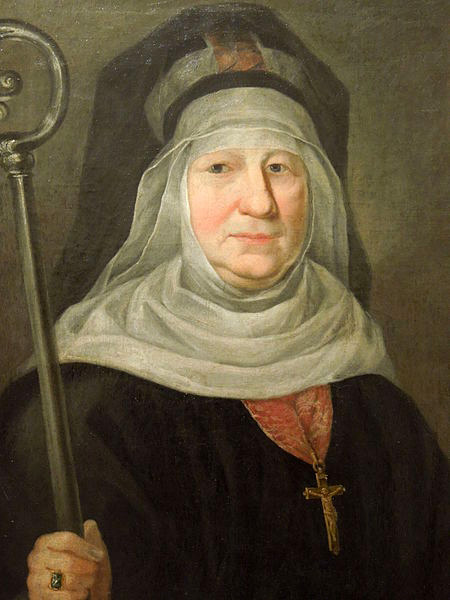
- Born: Irena Wińczowa c. 1800s Unknown (possibly Polish–Lithuanian territories)
- Died: February 11, 1869; Rome, Papal States
- Occupations: Self-styled nun, religious figure
- Known for: Impersonating a Basilian superior; alleged persecution narrative

Makryna Mieczysławska (born Irena Wińczowa; died 11 February 1869) was a 19th-century impostor who claimed to be a martyred Uniate nun persecuted under the Russian Empire. Her sensational account of resisting forced conversion to Eastern Orthodoxy during the suppression of the Greek Catholic Church was widely circulated in Polish émigré and Western Catholic circles, where she was celebrated as a heroine. Modern historical research has established that her narrative was largely fabricated.

== Biography ==
=== Public emergence ===
In 1845, Mieczysławska appeared in Paris, presenting herself as the former superior of a Basilian convent in Minsk allegedly closed by order of Bishop Joseph Semashko following the Synod of Polotsk (1839), which abolished the Union of Brest in the Russian Empire. She claimed that she and her fellow nuns had been tortured, forced into menial labor, and exiled to Siberia for refusing to convert to Orthodoxy. Her story gained traction among the Polish Great Emigration and was promoted in Catholic Europe as evidence of Russian religious persecution.

=== Activities in Rome ===
By 1849 she had settled in Rome, where she obtained audiences with Pope Gregory XVI and later Pope Pius IX. She became the superior of a newly established convent, funded by Polish émigré patrons and supported by elements of the Papal Curia sympathetic to the Polish cause. She remained in Rome until her death in 1869.

== Criticism and debunking ==
Russian diplomatic and ecclesiastical sources denied her claims from the outset, identifying her as Irena Wińczowa and asserting that she had never been a nun. In 1923 Jesuit historian Jan Urban demonstrated, on the basis of archival research, that Mieczysławska's account was fictitious. The actual last superior of the Minsk convent was Prakseda Lewszecka, who, along with other Basilian nuns, resisted the forced incorporation into Orthodoxy but did not suffer the extreme abuses alleged by Mieczysławska. Urban's findings have been accepted by later historians, including Wasyl Lencyk.

== Cultural legacy ==
Despite the exposure of her imposture, Makryna Mieczysławska became a powerful cultural symbol in 19th-century Polish literature. Juliusz Słowacki celebrated her in verse, while Cyprian Norwid and Stanisław Wyspiański incorporated her as a figure of moral resistance in their works. In the 21st century, her life was reimagined in Jacek Dehnel's novel Matka Makryna (2014), which portrays her as a consciously constructed persona navigating the politics of religion and exile.
