= Congregation of Marian Fathers of the Immaculate Conception =

Roman Catholic clerical congregation

Congregation of Marian Fathers of the Immaculate Conception of the Most Blessed Virgin Mary
- Congregatio Clericorum Marianorum sub titulo Immaculatæ Conceptionis Bmæ Virginis (Latin)
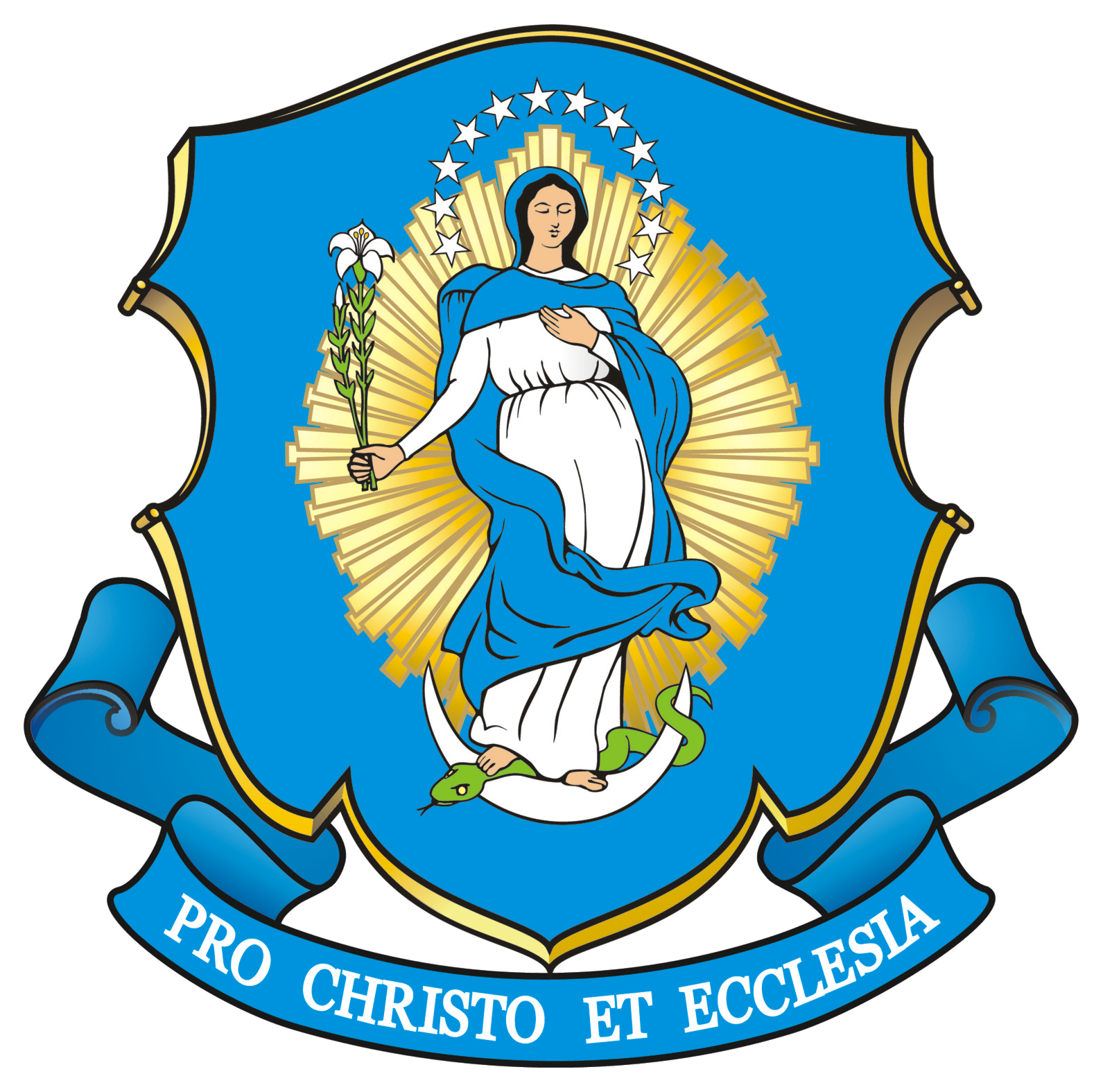
- Abbreviation: M.I.C. (post-nominal letters)
- Nickname: Marian Fathers
- Formation: 1673; 353 years ago
- Founder: Stanislaus of Jesus and Mary Papczyński, M.I.C.
- Founded at: Puszcza Marianska, Poland
- Type: Clerical Religious Congregation of Pontifical Right (for Men)
- Headquarters: General Mother house Via Corsica 1, 00198 Roma, Italy
- Members: 482 (320 Priests) as of 2019
- Motto: Latin: Pro Christo et Ecclesia; English: For Christ and the Church
- Superior General: Joseph Roesch
- Ministry: Educational, parochial, publication and missionary works
- Parent organization: Roman Catholic Church
- Website: www.padrimariani.org

The Congregation of Marian Fathers of the Immaculate Conception of the Most Blessed Virgin Mary (Latin: Congregatio Clericorum Marianorum ab Immaculata Conceptionis Beatissimae Virginis Mariae) is a Catholic male clerical religious congregation founded in 1670 in Poland by Stanislaus Papczyński. It is also known as Marians of the Immaculate Conception. Its members add the post-nominal letters M.I.C. after their names to indicate membership in the Congregation.

The Congregation of about 500 priests and brothers has convents in 19 countries on 6 continents. Marians pledge support to the Pope and follow the official teachings of the Catholic Church and aim to spread devotion to Blessed Virgin Mary as the Immaculate Conception, pray for the souls in purgatory and undertake a variety of apostolic work.

The Marians were the first Catholic religious institute for men dedicated to honor Mary's Immaculate Conception. Papczyński was beatified in Basilica of Our Lady of Licheń, Licheń Stary, Poland, in 2007 and canonized in 2016. As an Institute of consecrated life, their motto is Pro Christo et Ecclesia. They have been the official promoters of the Divine Mercy message since 1941.

== Early History ==
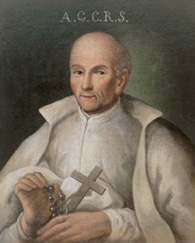
Stanislaus of Jesus and Mary Papczyński, founder of the Marians, on the oldest existing portrait from the end of the 17th century, Marian monastery in Skórzec, Poland.

On December 11, 1670, Stanislaus Papczyński publicly announced in his Oblatio the desire to establish a community of men dedicated to spreading the honor to the Immacuate Conception of the Blessed Virgin Mary. In 1673, in Puszcza Korabiewska (today known as Puszcza Marianska/Marian Forest) near Skierniewice, Poland, the first religious house of the Marians was approved by the local bishop. The first members of the community based their life on the Rule of Life, written by Papczyński. He tempered his plans at first to establish a community active in the church's service. At the beginning, the Marian Fathers lived an eremitical rule of life as they pursued final recognition and approval by the Catholic Church. Within a short time, the new and still small institute received approval from their local ordinary, Bishop Stephen Wierzbowski of Poznan.

Pope Innocent XII granted his approval for the young institute in 1699 with solemn vows under the French Rule of the Ten Virtues of the Blessed Virgin Mary, initially placing them within the Franciscans.

With the death of the founder in 1701, however, the Marian Fathers found themselves in a critical period of transition. Internal factions divided the membership into one group favoring a strictly contemplative life, and a second group seeking to add missionary and pastoral outreach to the institute's contemplative spirit. The period known as the "Rostkowski Dispersion" followed, fired by internal conflict, as well as the negative attitude expressed by some bishops and lay dignitaries. In 1716, Bishop Adam Rostkowski decided to close the Marian novitiate, instructing Marians to leave the monastery and move out to assume pastoral work in parishes.

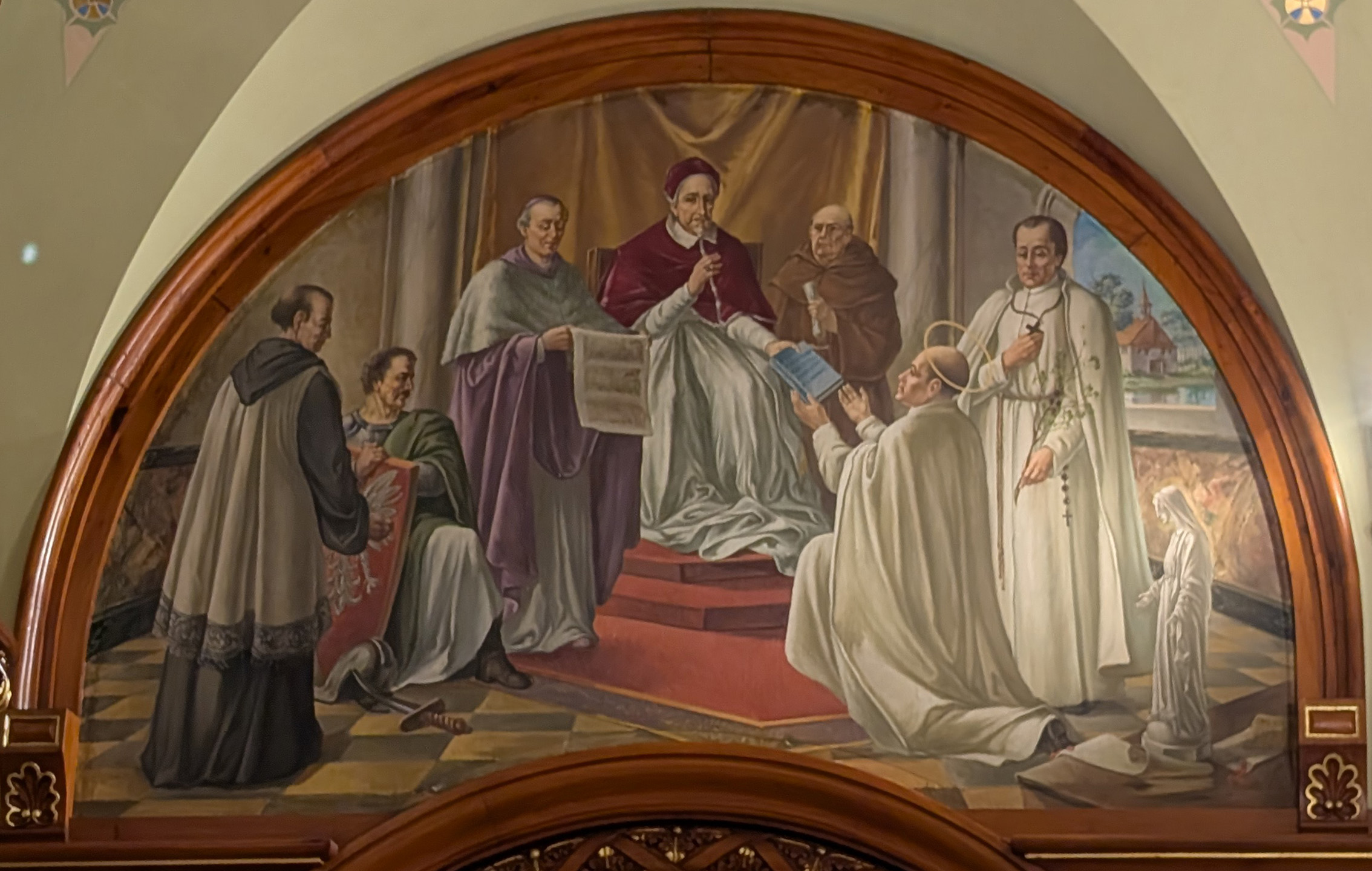
The Marian Fathers copnstitutions being presented to Innocent XIII, fresco at National Shrine of Divine Mercy

In 1722, Bishop John Tarlo of Poznan called the scattered Marians back to their monasteries, and convened a general chapter. The man elected to serve as Superior General was Andrew of St. Matthew Deszpot, a Czech originally received into the institute by the founder Papczyński. At the same chapter, a general procurator was chosen, Joachim of St. Ann Kozłowski. He was given the mission of going to Rome to have the institute's constitutions confirmed, and to remove the institute from the jurisdiction of local bishops. In 1723, Pope Innocent XIII approved the Marian statutes and released the institute from the interference of local bishops.

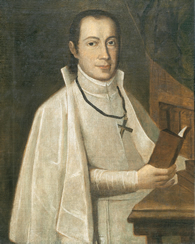
Casimir Wyszyński, Superior General of the Marians who established the institute in Portugal.

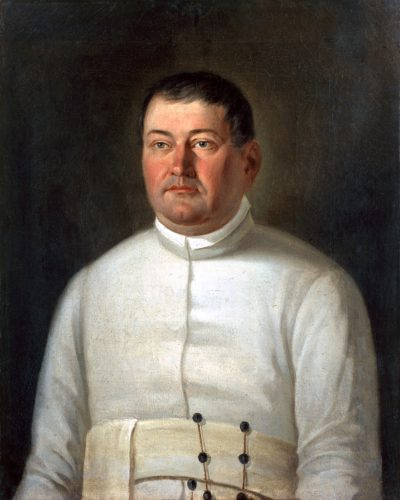
Raymond Nowicki

The rest of the 18th century was marked by steady growth as the Marians expanded from Poland to Portugal and Italy thanks to the efforts of two outstanding Superiors General of the institute: Casimir Wyszyński (1700–1755) and Raymond Nowicki (1735–1801).

Rapid changes in the European political situation by the end of the 18th and through 19th century led to the near destruction of the institute.

With the complete failure of the Kosciuszko Uprising in 1795, Poland lost its independence. Now the Marian Fathers found themselves divided by virtually sealed borders. The partitioning of the Polish Republic was decreed by the occupying armies of Russia, Prussia, and Austria.

Again, in 1798, after Napoleon seized Rome, he mandated that all foreigners be expelled from its borders. The exodus included the Marian Fathers removed from their monastery and Rome's St. Vitus Church.

In 1834, the Portuguese government became hostile toward all religious, and finally closed all Marian monasteries in that nation.

In Eastern Europe following the Vienna Congress of 1815, most of the Marian monasteries found themselves in the newly created Kingdom of Poland, which was part of Imperial Russia, whose Czarist regime was openly hostile to the Catholic Church.

The defeat of two Polish national uprisings against Czarist Russia, one in November 1830, and another in January 1863, meant repression for religious institutes in Poland. The Czarist regime prohibited the acceptance of new candidates to the religious life, effectively stamping out the normal process of growth in vocations to the religious life for the Marian Fathers and other institutes.

One of the most famous Marians in the 19th century was Christopher Szwernicki. In 1852, he was exiled to Irkutsk, where he built the church and an orphanage for the deportees’ children. In 1888 he was titled "Apostle of Siberia" by Pope Leo XIII.

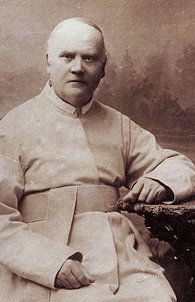
Vincent Sękowski

By 1865, the Russian occupying forces allowed only one Marian monastery to remain open in Marijampolė, Lithuania. All Marians were sent to Marijampolė. Such rulings were nothing less than a death sentence for the religious institute. By the year 1904, that last Marian house closed, since so few Marians remained. By 1908, only one Marian remained, Vincent Sękowski (Senkus). He was the last Superior General. All other Marians had died, or asked to leave to join the ranks of the diocesan clergy. For all appearances, the Czarist persecutions had succeeded. The Marian Fathers seemed to have come to the end of the line.

== Refoundation ==
At this critical moment in the history of the Marian institute, an ardent and energetic Lithuanian priest came to visit Sękowski, with the aim of secretly renewing it. The priest was George Matulaitis-Matulewicz, and at that time he was a professor at the Academy of Theology in St. Petersburg, Russia. Matulaitis had a profound understanding of the contributions and significance of religious life to society, although Catholic monasteries were being suppressed at that time. He believed it was important to do whatever needed to be done to revive Catholic religious life in the lands dominated by Imperial Russia.

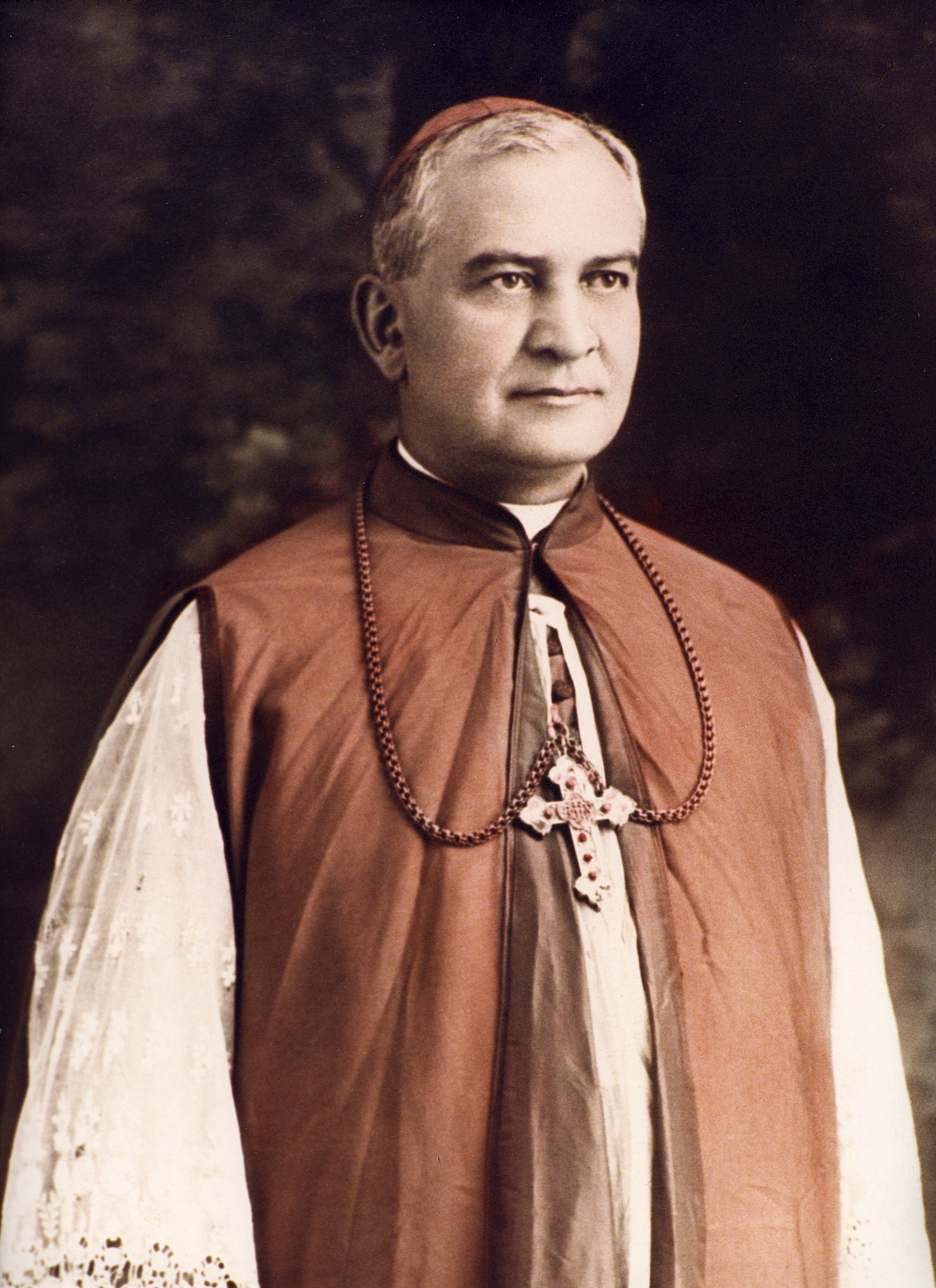
Archbishop George (Jurgis) Matulaitis-Matulewicz

As a youth, he had been brought up in a village where the Marian Fathers staffed the local parish. The experience had left him with a lifelong respect and admiration for the Marian Fathers. And so Matulaitis, along with his friend Francis-Peter Bucys, who had also grown up with Marian religious influence, entered the Marian institute with the intention of saving it from disappearing into history, along with all its promise for God's work. They had to become Marians in secret in order to thwart Imperial Russian authorities, who continued to persecute the church.

Matulaitis made his vows and was accepted into the Marian institute by Sękowski, and in the same year, 1909, Francis Peter Bucys became the first novice of the institute on its way to renewed life.

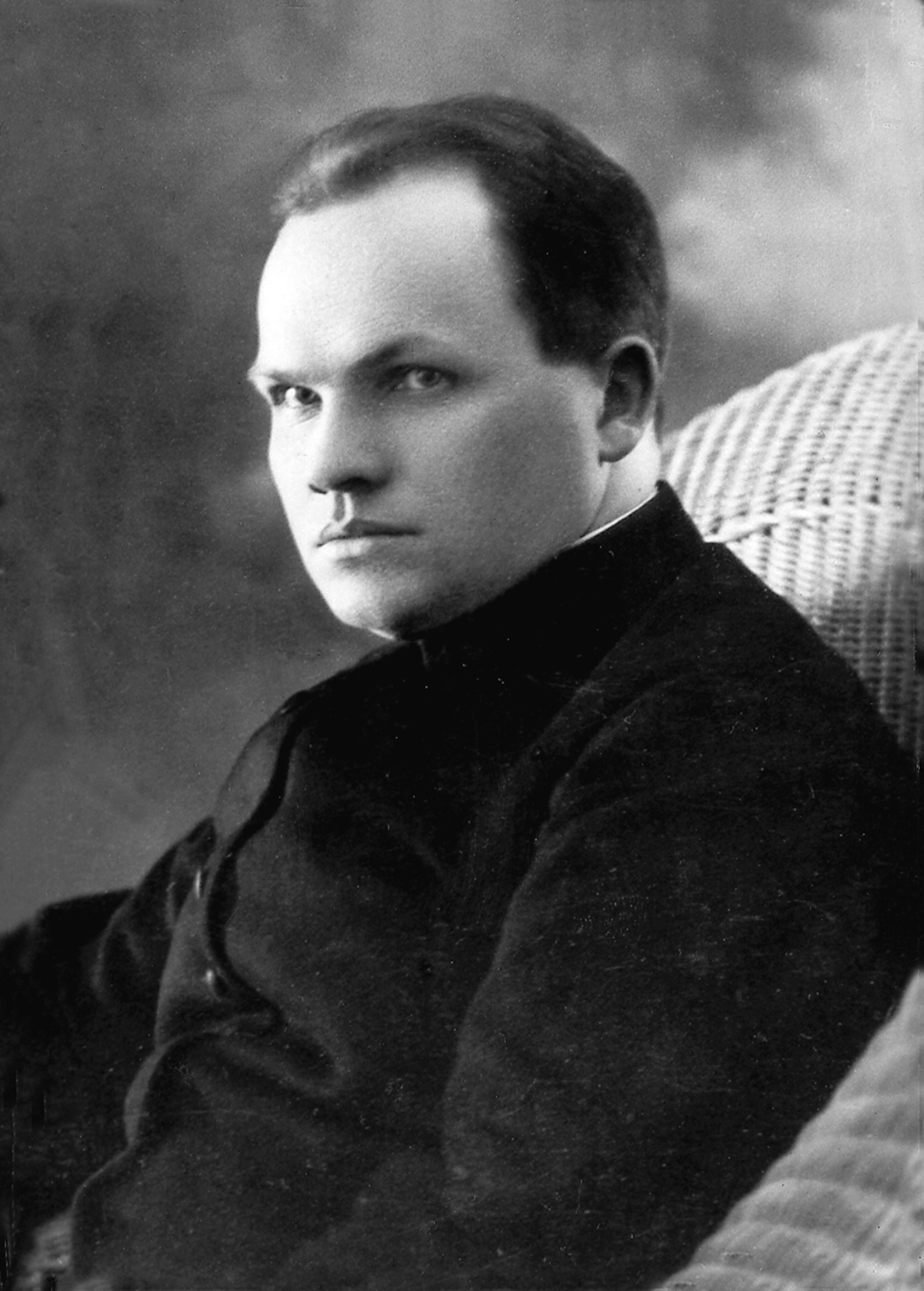
Anthony Leszczewicz

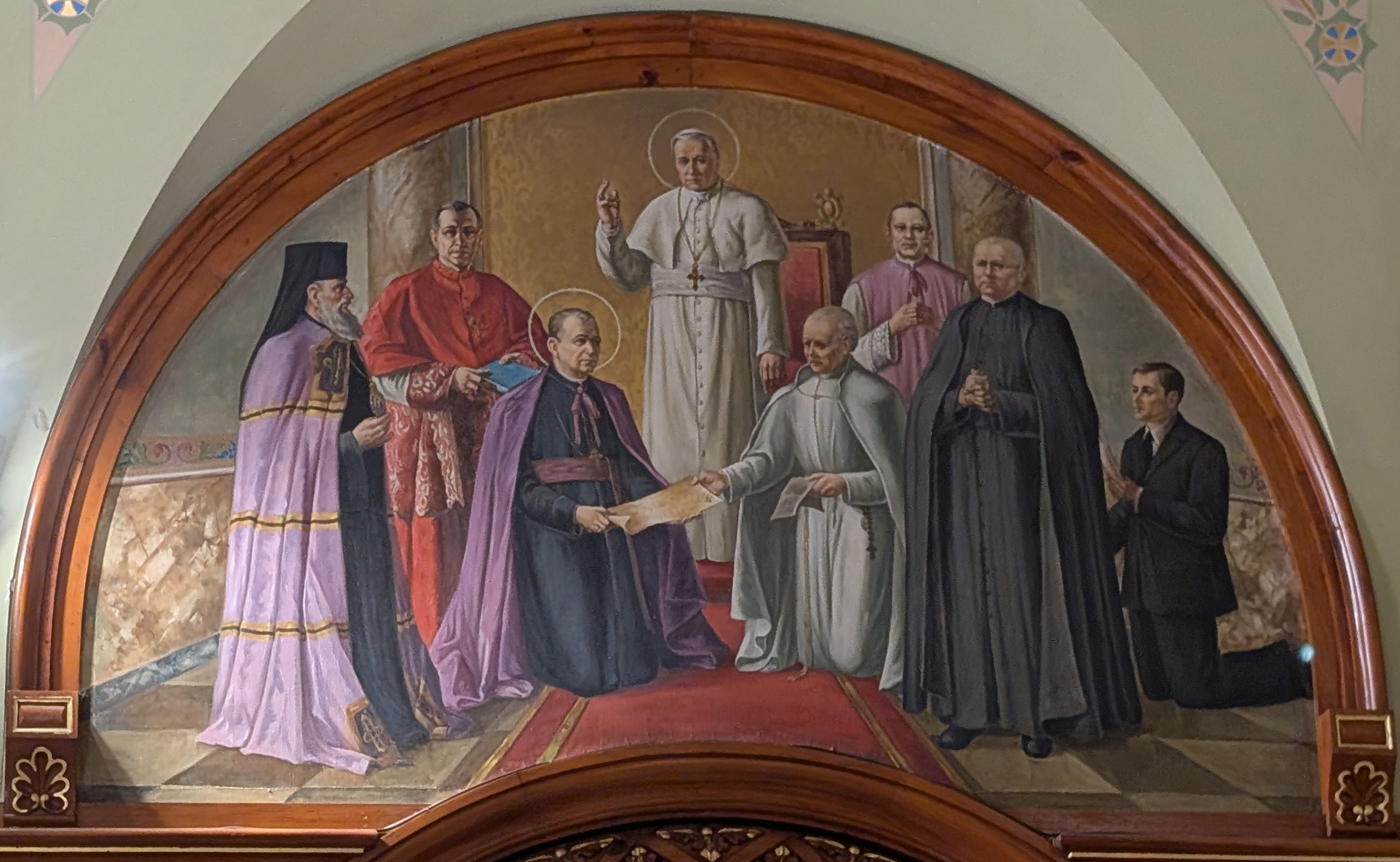
Jurgis Matulaitis-Matulevičius presenting the new constituions to Pius X, fresco at National Shrine of Divine Mercy

Matulaitis wrote the renewed institute's constitutions, inspired by the spirit of Stanislaus Papczyński and the desire to adapt his ideals to modern times. The new constitutions and revived form of Marian life were approved by Pope Pius X in 1910. Sękowski, who was the last of the "White Marians", lived on for five months after papal approval for Marian renewal.

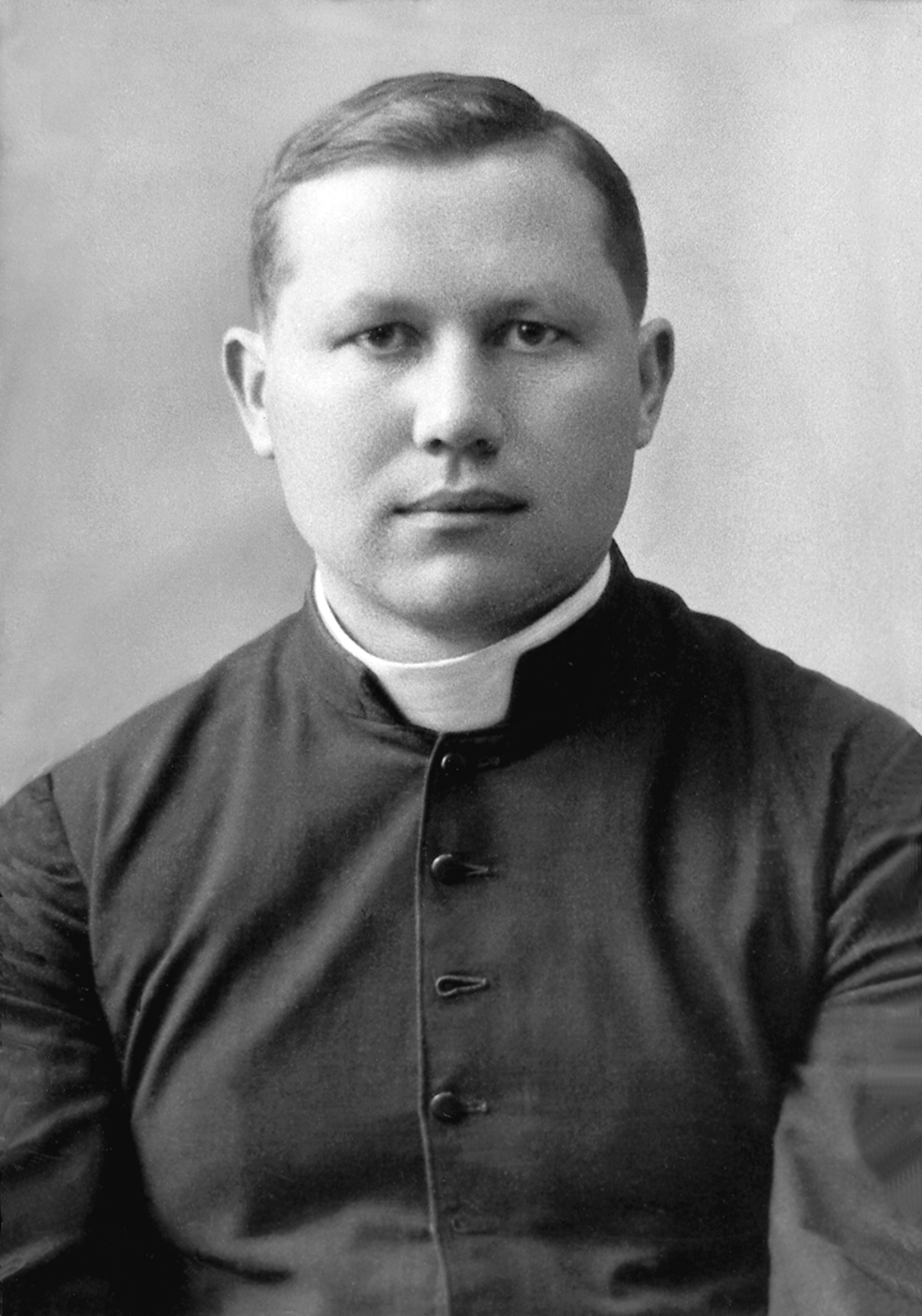
George Kaszyra

To assure that the institute could continue to flourish without interference from the Imperial government, the secret Marian novitiate and house of studies were transferred from St. Petersburg in Russia to Fribourg in Switzerland. From this time on, the Marian Fathers began to experience consistent growth. In 1927, the year when Archbishop George Matulaitis-Matulewicz died, the congregation had grown to around 300 members (among them George Kaszyra and Anthony Leszczewicz, Eugene Kulesza, and Janis Mendriks).

Bucys succeeded Matulaitis as the superior general of the renovated congregation. Thanks to Matulaitis's reforms, the Marian Fathers became a modern religious congregation. Yet Matulaitis did not change the main ideals of the religious community, such as spreading devotion to the Immaculate Conception of the Blessed Virgin Mary and supplication for the souls suffering in Purgatory. However, he did expand the field of the Marian apostolate and introduced significant changes into the Marian Fathers' way of life, adapting it to the new conditions and needs of modern times.

== 20th century ==
Although it is now an international organization, the Marians still have strong roots in Poland, (e.g. the Sanctuary of Our Lady of Licheń) and place a great deal of emphasis on spreading the messages of Divine Mercy of Faustina Kowalska. Between 1959-78 when this particular devotion was under an interdict by the Holy See and was not to be promoted, the order preached on the scriptural foundations of Divine Mercy, without reference to the revelations to Faustina.

Between 1950 and 1986 the Marian Fathers operated two boarding schools in England, at Lower Bullingham near Hereford and the second, Divine Mercy College, at Fawley Court, Buckinghamshire, (north of Henley-on-Thames). Though intended for boys of Polish origin, in particular the children of the 100,000+ Poles who found exile in Britain after the Second World War, a proportion of the boys accepted were non-Poles. In 1987, the Marians distributed the film Divine Mercy: No Escape, which depicted the life of Maria Faustina Kowalska and featured a presentation by Pope John Paul II.

In 1996 the priests Seraphim Michalenko and George Kosicki formed the John Paul II Institute of Divine Mercy to provide instruction in Divine Mercy theology and spirituality to both parish leaders and clergy. At its inception, Pope John Paul II entrusted the institute with the task of providing "formation and research in The Divine Mercy message". Their role in spreading the Divine Mercy message was acknowledged by Pope John Paul II in a special papal blessing in 2001, the 70th anniversary of the revelation of the Divine Mercy Message and Devotion.

== 21st century ==
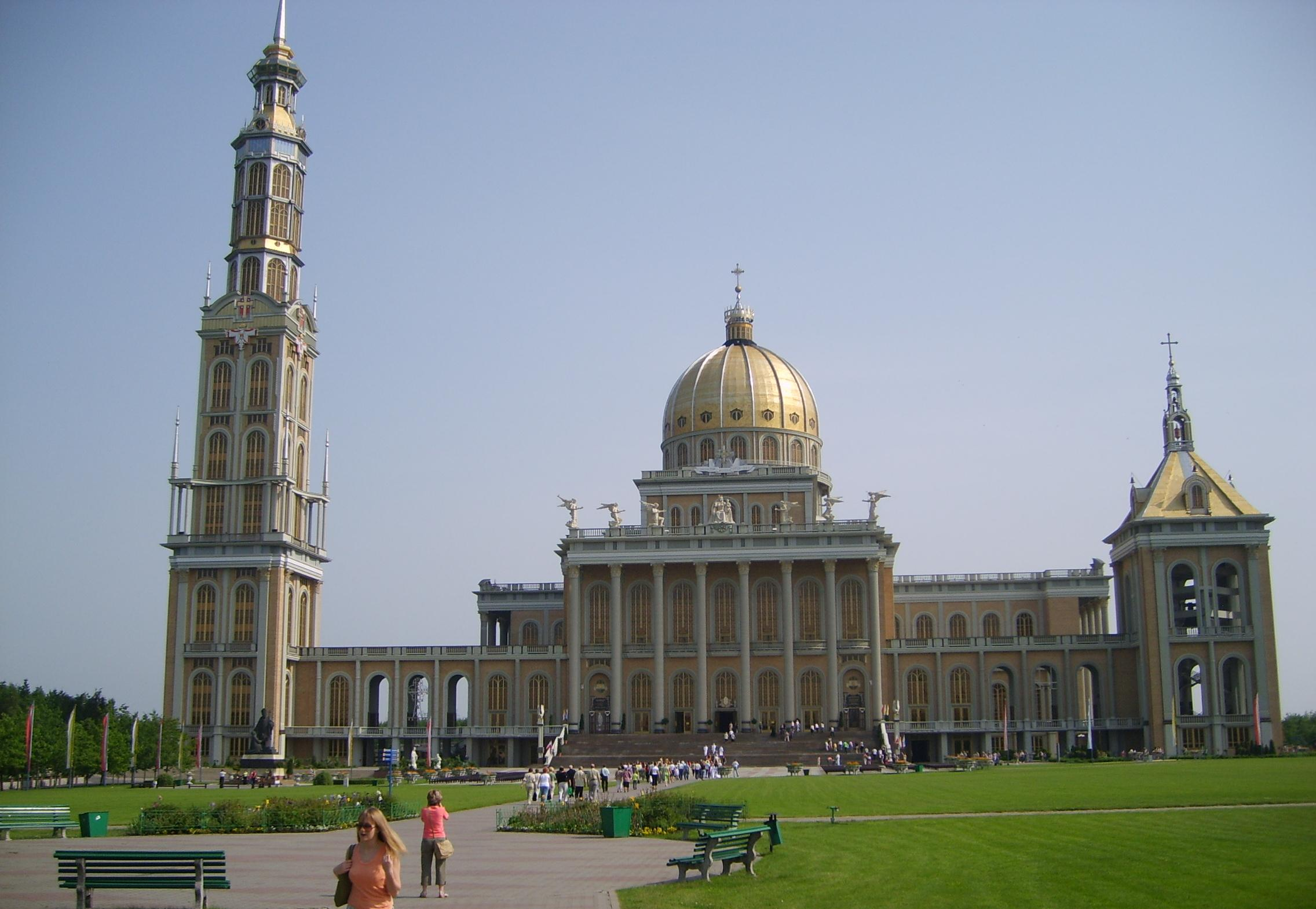
Licheń Basilica

With a Polish Pope in the chair of Saint Peter and the Fall of the Berlin Wall, the circumstances were ripe for a resurgence of the Marian order in Poland. The Fathers laid plans to erect an ambitious new shrine to Mary, to rival that of Częstochowa, in the village Licheń Stary, scene of a 19th-century Napoleonic soldier's devotion. The resulting basilica and visitor centre, designed by Barbara Bielecka and blessed in 1999 by John Paul II, was completed in 2004 and is said to be the largest church building in Poland. The construction was said to have been funded entirely by pilgrims' donations.

In 2009 the Marian Fathers controversially sold the Grade I listed Fawley Court, which had previously served as a school, museum and focus for the Polish community in Britain.

== Statistics ==
- 2006: 350 priests 517 male religious
- 2007: 345 priests 506 male religious
- 2008: 348 priests 492 male religious
- 2010: 345 priests 472 male religious
- 2011: 350 priests 478 male religious
- 2012: 349 priests 471 male religious

== Affiliated bishops and senior clergy ==
- Fabijan Abrantovich
- Francis Brazys (Priest: 19 December 1942 to 22 December 1964)
- Francis-Peter Bucys (Priest: 25 March 1899; Superior General: 27 July 1927 to 21 July 1933)
- Andrei Tsikota
- Pranciškus Karevičius (Priest: 17 May 1886 to 27 February 1914)
- Andrei Katkoff (Priest: 30 July 1944 to 14 November 1958)
- Jan Paweł Lenga (Priest: 28 May 1980 to 13 April 1991)
- Jurgis Matulaitis-Matulevičius (Priest: 20 November 1898; Superior General: 14 July 1911 to 23 October 1918)
- Jan Olszanski (Priest: 15 November 1942 to 16 January 1991)
- Liudas Povilonis
- Ceslao Sipovic (Priest: 16 June 1940 to 2 July 1960; Superior General: 2 July 1963 to 28 July 1969)
- Vincentas Sladkevičius (Priest: 25 March 1944 to 14 November 1957)
- Juozas Žemaitis (Priest: 25 September 1949)
- Archimandrite Jan Sergiusz Gajek is the apostolic administrator without episcopal rank for the faithful of Byzantine rite in Belarus.

== Bibliography ==
- Andrew R. Mączyński, MIC and Maciej P.Talar Three Centuries with Mary Immaculate As Patroness. Marian Press
- Tadeusz Rogalewski, MIC Stanislaus Papczynski (1631-1701). Marian Press, ISBN 0-944203-62-0
