= Divine Mercy: No Escape =

1987 film

- Directed by: Hermann D. Tauchert
- Written by: Hermann D. Tauchert; Seraphim Michalenko
- Produced by: Hermann D. Tauchert
- Starring: Melanie Metcalf
- Narrated by: Helen Hayes
- Cinematography: Hermann D. Tauchert; Jon Choate
- Edited by: Hermann D. Tauchert
- Music by: Peter F. Rotter; Louis Febre
- Production companies: Tauchert & Associates Production
- Distributed by: Congregation of Marians of the Immaculate Conception
- Release date: September 15, 1987 (Mann's Chinese Theatre)
- Running time: 63 minutes (theatrical version); 47 minutes (revised version)
- Country: United States
- Language: English

Divine Mercy: No Escape is a 1987 American religious biographical film edited, produced, and directed by Hermann D. Tauchert, written by Tauchert and Fr. Seraphim Michalenko, and starring Melanie Metcalf as Polish nun Maria Faustina Kowalska.

It was shot in Vatican City, Poland, and Germany in addition to the United States, and includes a presentation by Pope John Paul II.

Distributed by the Congregation of Marians of the Immaculate Conception, the film premiered at Mann's Chinese Theatre in Los Angeles, California in 1987. Later, it premiered in the Philippines at Virra Mall in Quezon City on March 7, 1988, and was later shown at the Coronet Theater in the same city for two days beginning on March 31 for Holy Week.

== Cast ==
- Melanie Metcalf as Maria Faustina Kowalska
- Fr. John Bertolucci
- Rabbi Harold S. Kushner
- Dr. Robert H. Schuller
- Dr. Ali Abu-Bekr
- Fr. Bruce Ritter
- Fr. Tom Weston, S.J.
- Mother Teresa
- Francis Cardinal Macharski

Helen Hayes serves as the narrator.

== Home media ==
Divine Mercy was released on VHS by the Congregation of Marians of the Immaculate Conception in 1994.

A revised version of Divine Mercy was released on DVD on January 4, 2001; this version shortens the film's running time from 63 minutes to 47 minutes.
