= Jacek Dehnel =

Polish poet, writer, translator and painter

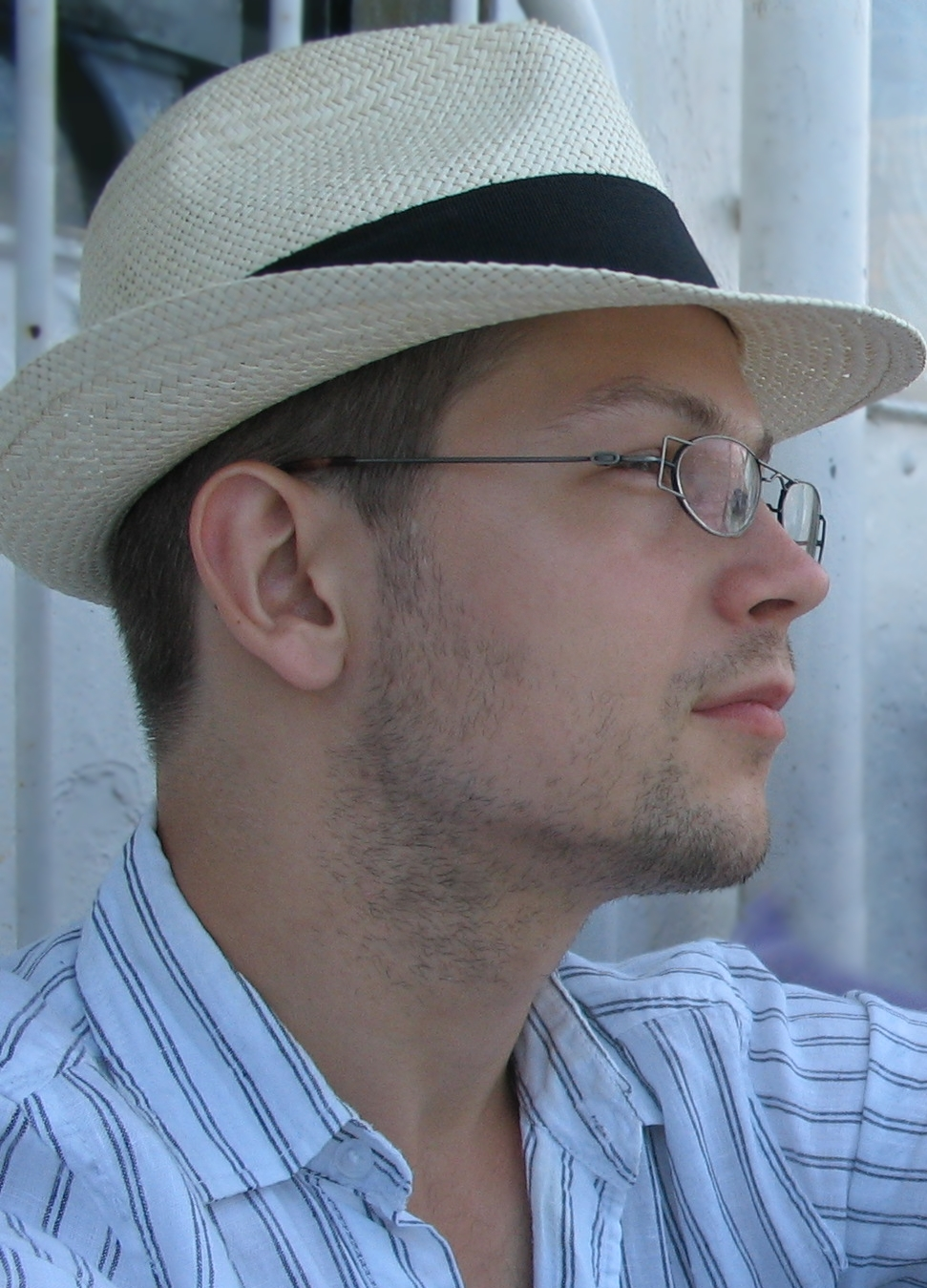
- Born: 1 May 1980 (age 46); Gdańsk, Poland
- Education: University of Warsaw
- Occupations: poet, writer, translator, painter
- Known for: Balzakian; Matka Makryna; Krivoklat
- Spouse(s): Piotr Tarczyński (m. 2018)
- Awards: Kościelski Award (2005); Paszport Polityki (2007)
- Honours: Bronze Medal for Merit to Culture – Gloria Artis

Jacek Maria Dehnel (born 1 May 1980 in Gdańsk, Poland) is a Polish poet, writer, translator and painter.

== Life and work ==
He graduated from the Stefan Żeromski High School No. 5 in Gdańsk, where he excelled in Humanities. Dehnel studied at the University of Warsaw's College of Inter-Area Individual Studies In the Humanities and Social Sciences (Polish: Kolegium Międzyobszarowych Indywidualnych Studiów Humanistycznych i Społecznych) and graduated from the Faculty of Polish Language and Literature, where he obtained a Master of Arts (M.A.) degree, writing a thesis on Stanisław Barańczak's translations of Philip Larkin's works.

His first collection of poems was the last book recommended by Polish Nobel Prize Laureate, Czesław Miłosz. Dehnel has published his poems in various literary magazines, including Kwartalnik Artystyczny, Studium, Przegląd Artystyczno-Literacki, Topos, Tytuł, Undergrunt. He also works for an internet literary portal Nieszuflada.

Between September 2006 and July 2009, he was a co-host of cultural programme ŁOSssKOT broadcast on TVP1 (together with musician Tymon Tymański and journalist Maciej Chmiel).

Dehnel has translated poetry of such poets as Osip Mandelshtam, W. H. Auden, Mary Oliver – unpublished, and Philip Larkin, George Szirtes – published. He has also rendered in Polish lyrics for songs by Ástor Piazzolla.

He has been awarded literary prizes that include the Kościelski Award in 2005, the Paszport Polityki in 2007 and the cultural award of the city of Gdańsk Splendor Gedanesis in 2009. He received five nominations for Poland's most prestigious literary prize – the Nike Award: Balzakian (2009), Ekran kontrolny (2010), Saturn (2012); Matka Makryna (2015) and Krivoklat (2017) as well as two nominations for the Angelus Award for Lala (2007) and Saturn (2012) and the 2014 Wisława Szymborska Award for his book of poems Języki obce ("Foreign Languages").

In 2015, he was awarded Bronze Medal for Merit to Culture - Gloria Artis.

In 2017, he co-wrote the screenplay to the award-winning experimental animated biographical drama film Loving Vincent about the life of painter Vincent van Gogh, and in particular, the circumstances of his death.

== Personal life ==
He lived and worked in Warsaw, from March 2020 in Berlin. He is gay, which is reflected in his literary works. In 2018, he married his long-term partner, translator and historian Piotr Tarczyński, in Wandsworth Town Hall in London. Dehnel and his partner publish works under the female pseudonym Maryla Szymiczkowa. In 2019, he undertook apostasy. Dehnel and Tarczyński left Warsaw for Berlin in 2021.

== Books ==
=== Prose ===
- Kolekcja ("The Collection"), (a collection of short stories), Marpress, Gdańsk, 1999
- Rynek w Smyrnie, (a collection of short stories), W.A.B., Warsaw, 2007
- Lala, (a novel), W.A.B., Warsaw, 2006
  - Lala. Translated by Antonia Lloyd-Jones. Oneworld Publications, London 2018, ISBN 978-1786073570
- Balzakiana,(a collection of four mininovels) W.A.B., Warsaw, 2008
- Saturn. Czarne obrazy z życia mężczyzn z rodziny Goya, W.A.B., Warsaw (English translation by Antonia Lloyd-Jones, published by Dedalus Books in 2013), 2011
- Kosmografia, czyli trzydzieści apokryfów tułaczych, accompanying an exhibition of 15th-century maps in the Warsaw National Library, Biblioteka Narodowa, Warsaw (a collection of short stories), 2012
- Młodszy księgowy, (a collection of columns on books and reading), W.A.B., Warsaw, 2013
- Matka Makryna ("Mother Makryna"), W.A.B, 2014
- Tajemnica domu Helclów, (co-written with his partner Piotr Tarczyński), Znak literanova, 2015
- Dziennik Roku Chrystusowego, W.A.B., 2015
- Nowy Tajny Detektyw, NCK and Fundacja Picture Doc, 2015
- Proteusz, czyli o przemianach. Spacerownik po historii Muzeum Narodowego w Warszawie, Serenissima, Warsaw, 2015
- Krivoklat, Znak, 2016
- Rozdarta zasłona, (co-written with Piotr Tarczyński) Społeczny Instytut Wydawniczy Znak, 2016
- Mrs Mohr Goes Missing, (co-written with Piotr Tarczyński and translated by Antonia Lloyd Jones) Bloomsbury, 2019
- Ale z naszymi umarłymi, Wydawnictwo Literackie, 2019
- Łabędzie, Wydawnictwo Literackie, 2023

=== Poetry ===
- Żywoty równoległe ("The Parallel Lives"), Zielona Sowa, Kraków, 2004
- Wyprawa na południe ("An Expedition Southwards"), Teatr Mały w Tychach, Tychy, 2005
- Wiersze ("Poems"), Lampa i Iskra Boża, Warsaw, 2006
- Brzytwa okamgnienia, Biuro Literackie, Wrocław, 2007
- Ekran kontrolny, Biuro Literackie, Wrocław, 2009
- Rubryki strat i zysków, Biuro Literackie, Wrocław, 2011
- Języki obce ("Foreign Languages"), Biuro Literackie, Wrocław, 2013
- Seria w ciemność, Biuro Literackie, Wrocław, 2016
- Najdziwniejsze (The strangest), Wrocław, Biuro Literackie, 2019
- Bruma, Cracow, Wydawnictwo a5, 2022

=== Translations ===
- Philip Larkin Zebrane (Collected: The Less Deceived, The Whitsun Weddings and High Windows), Biuro Literackie, Wrocław, 2008
- Edmund White Hotel de Dream, Biuro Literackie, Wrocław (with Piotr Tarczyński), 2012
- Francis Scott Fitzgerald Wielki Gatsby (The Great Gatsby), Znak, Kraków, 2013

=== Other ===
- Six Polish Poets (as a poet and as an editor), 2009. Arc Publications, London.
- Il vetro è sottile. Poeti polacchi contemporanei tradotti da poeti (as a poet and editor with Matteo Campagnoli), 2012. Bellinzona, Casagrande.

== See also ==
- Nike Award
- Polish literature
- List of Polish-language poets
