= Joseph Semashko =

Ukrainian bishop (1798–1868)

Metropolitan Joseph
- Митрополит Иосиф
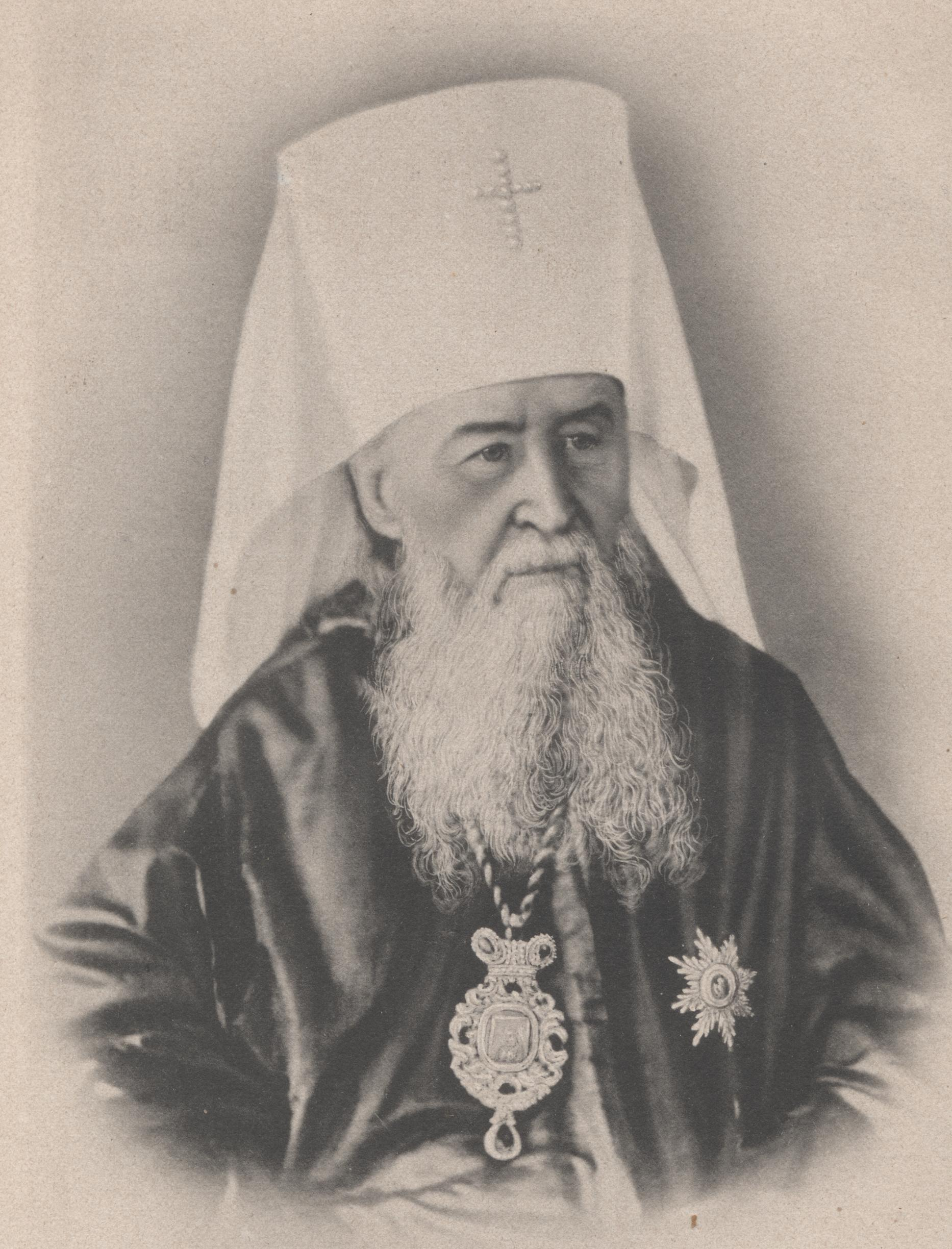
- Semashko Yosyf
- Title: Metropolitan Bishop

Personal life
- Born: Yosyf Yosyfovich Semashko; 25 December 1798
- Died: 23 November 1868 (aged 69)
- Known for: Synod of Polotsk

Religious life
- Religion: Christianity
- Church: Russian Orthodox Church, Ruthenian Uniate Church

Joseph Semashko (Ukrainian: Йосиф Семашко, romanized: Yosyf Semashko; Polish: Józef Siemaszko; Russian: Иосиф Семашко, romanized: Iosif Semashko; 25 December 1798 – 23 November 1868) was a Ukrainian Eastern Catholic priest and bishop who played a central role in the highly-controversial conversion of the Ruthenian Uniate Church of the western provinces of the Russian Empire to Russian Orthodoxy between 1837 and 1839. Subsequently, he became an archbishop in the Russian Orthodox hierarchy, elevated to the Metropolitan bishop of Vilnius and Lithuania in 1852.

== Early life and education ==
Semashko was born and raised in right-bank Ukraine, in Pavlivka near Illintsi in the Kiev Governorate (now in Vinnytsia Oblast of Ukraine). His father Yosyf (1776–1856) was originally a farmer and trader, then became a Uniate clergyman in 1811. As there were almost no Catholic churches in the region, Semashko attended Orthodox services more often than Catholic in his childhood. His mother tongue was Ukrainian and he acquired Polish at school. He graduated from the school in Nemyriv, and then from the Catholic Seminary in Vilnius. At the age of 21 he was ordained a Uniate priest.

In 1822, he became an assessor of the Roman Catholic Spiritual College (the church board of administration, responsible for religious affairs for Catholics of both rites) in St. Petersburg, working in the Uniate department of the College. This appointment was influenced by his relatively good command of the Russian language, rare among Uniate clergy at the time. During his stay in Petersburg, he established extensive contacts, including with the head of the department of foreign denominations at the Ministry of Public Education, Grigory Kartashevskiy, and with the Minister of Education, Alexander Shishkov. Delighted by the splendor of the Orthodox churches in the Russian capital, and at the same time alienated from the Roman Catholic clergy, which in his view treated the Uniates in a condescending way, he adopted a Russian identity.

== Uniate Church and Synod of Polotsk ==
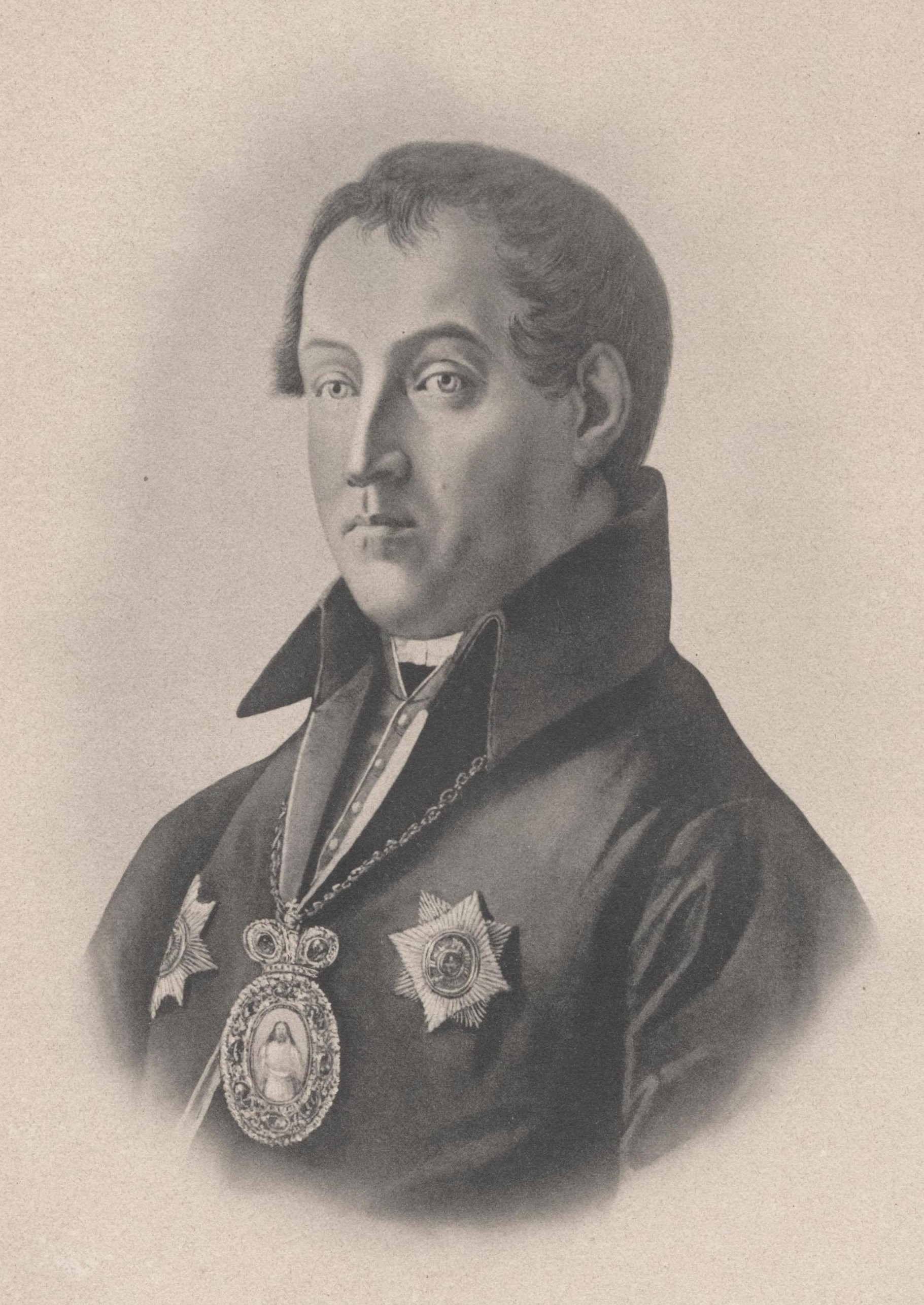
Semashko as a Uniate bishop

After the second and third partitions of Poland, Russia acquired a large Uniate population in Belarus and Ukraine. By the end of Catherine II's reign, roughly half of this population was converted, with 1.5 million Uniate faithful remaining (mostly in Volhynia and Belarus). By the mid-1820s, the Uniates remained a significant religious group, with nearly 1500 parishes and over 75 monasteries of the Basilian Order.

In 1827, Semashko wrote a memorandum advocating for the unification of remaining Uniate parishes in the Russian Empire with the Orthodox Church. The memorandum made the following suggestions:

- liquidation of two of the existing four Uniate dioceses,
- subordination of the affairs of the Uniate Church to the Holy Governing Synod,
- reorganization of the Basilian Order along the Orthodox model: the subordination of monasteries to the bishops of the dioceses in which they were located,
- creation of schools for children of Uniate clergy not led by Basilians.

The plan was read and enthusiastically approved by Emperor Nicholas I.

Semashko was consecrated bishop of Mstislaw and head of the Belarusian consistory in 1829 and bishop of Lithuania in 1832. He carried out significant reforms in the Greek Catholic Church, which would ultimately lead to its joining the Orthodox Church. He abolished the right of patronage and introduced Orthodox liturgical books from the Moscow Holy Synod press to replace Uniate liturgical books. In Uniate churches, whose appearance and equipment had undergone Latinisation in the previous decades, iconostases, Orthodox utensils, and liturgical vestments were restored. He encouraged the Uniate clergy, who spoke Polish much better than Russian, to abandon their Ruthenian identity (Ukrainian or Belarusian) and adopt Russian.

Semashko worked extensively to monitor the Uniate clergy. In 1834, he personally met with approximately 800 priests over the course of two months. He also kept a notebook containing information on 1200 Uniate priests and 300 monastics. Semashko utilized his ability to close the parishes of certain clergy who were deemed unreliable and relocate parishioners to nearby ones. Between 1831 and 1836, Russian authorities closed forty-four monasteries suspected of supporting Polish rebels and nearly all Basilian schools.

In 1835, Semashko was invited to join a secret government committee charged with bringing about the unification of the Uniate and Orthodox Church. The committee included Minister of Interior Affairs Dmitry Bludov, Procurator of the Holy Synod Stepan Nechaev, Moscow Metropolitan Filaret, Uniate Metropolitan Josaphat Bulhak, Semashko, and several other government officials and Orthodox clerics. The complicated situation on the ground, in which numerous Uniates and Roman Catholics were protesting against the transformation of Uniate churches, quickly led to disagreements within the committee. To overcome this, Bludov asked the emperor to create an even smaller top-secret sub-committee of four people: Semashko, Bludov, Filaret, and Nechaev. Among the Orthodox hierarchs, only Filaret knew about Semashko's plan in its entirety, while others were largely kept in the dark. In the end, this smaller group oversaw all the important steps in the process of preparing for the reunification of February 1839. As a crucial step, in 1837 Semashko's old idea of subordinating the Uniate church to the Orthodox Synod, which the tsar had approved in 1832, was implemented. The church was subordinated directly to the Procurator of the Holy Synod, who was a secular official rather than a cleric.

In 1838 the formal head of the Uniate Church, Metropolitan Josaphat Bulhak died of natural causes, leaving the church hierarchy entirely in the hands of Semashko and his adepts. By the end of the year, Semashko had already submitted a memorandum arguing for starting the reunion, and the Orthodox metropolitans of Moscow and Kyiv quickly agreed. With the help of the authorities, Semashko collected 1,305 statements from Uniate priests declaring their willingness to join the Orthodox church; yet, despite the threats of arrests and exile, 593 priests refused to sign the statement. On 12 February 1839, the Uniate clergy gathered in Polotsk. The meeting, known as the Synod of Polotsk, adopted the Act of Reunion and issued an appeal to the tsar (prepared by Semashko) that would result in the transfer of 1,600 Uniate parishes and the incorporation of 1.5 million parishioners into the body of imperial Orthodoxy.

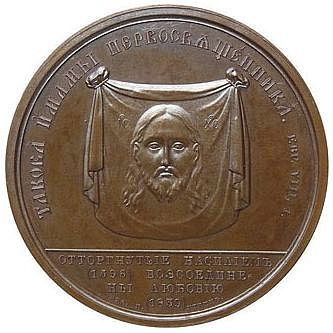
Synod of Polotsk Medal, bottom: "Separated by Violence 1596, Reunited by Love 1839"

Afterward, Semashko declared of himself, "The Lord, having chosen his instrument for the completion of this noble deed, animated him with insuperable fervor and gave him powers to overcome all obstacles."

== Orthodox Hierarch ==
On April 11, 1839, the Greek Catholic Ecclesiastical Collegium was renamed the Belarus-Lithuanian Ecclesiastical Collegium, with Semashko elevated to the rank of Archbishop (of Vilnius and Lithuania) and appointed the Chairman of the Collegium. In his drive to enforce decisions of the Synod of Polotsk, Semashko relied mainly on persuasion and manipulation against the clergy and parishioners, but he did not hesitate to utilize administrative and police repressions against Greek Catholics who refused to convert. He confined the reluctant Basilians to a specially created monastery prison in Kursk which existed until 1842, other priests indicated by him were deprived of parishes, and some were deported to Siberia.

In 1847, Semashko became a member of the Holy Synod of the Orthodox Church. In that year, a diplomatic agreement between the Vatican and the Russian Empire was negotiated and enacted. This agreement codified the rights of the Catholic clergy and laity in the Empire. Semashko held negative views of the agreement, particularly because in his Lithuanian dioceses Roman Catholics outnumbered the Orthodox population three to one. He complained about the influence Roman Catholic clergy and nobility had on the civil administration of the area, and in 1851 wrote a long letter to the emperor asking for permission to resign. As with all his previous requests of that nature, this one was not granted. Instead, in 1852, Semashko was elevated to the rank of metropolitan. This was a rare case of the elevation of a bishop in a provincial seat to the rank of metropolitan.

With the death of Nicholas I, Semashko's influence in the Holy Synod diminished, but he continued his struggle against the Catholic Church in the Western Krai. In February 1859, through the Ober-Procurator of the Holy Synod, he sent a note warning Tsar Alexander II about the undesirable consequences of the conciliatory policy towards the Polish people and Catholicism in the Western Territory. In 1863, during the Polish uprising, he consistently supported the Imperial government, appealing to his flock to remain faithful to the Russian Tsar and the Orthodox Church.

Semashko died on November 23, 1868, in Vilnius. He was buried in a tomb that he built for himself under the relics of the Martyrs of Vilnius. In his will, he allocated funds to the Imperial Academy of Sciences for the publication of his memoirs. In 1883 his autobiography and a collection of documents associated with his life were published as Zapiski Iosifa, Mitropolita Litovskago (The Notes of Yosyf, Metropolitan of Lithuania, 1883, 3 vols).

== Controversies and legacy ==
The events of the Synod of Polotsk were met with consternation in the Vatican and in Catholic Europe. Pope Gregory XVI condemned all the bishops who initiated the apostasy and protested to Emperor Nicholas I himself. As the face of the Synod of Polotsk, Semashko's name instantly became notorious in Catholic circles. This notoriety reached its peak in 1845 when a Greek Catholic nun, Mother Makryna Mieczysławska arrived in Rome with an account of atrocities committed with the full knowledge and approval of Tsar Nicholas I by the Imperial Russian Army and by Bishop Semashko against the Basilian nuns of Minsk. She stated that in 1838 Semashko personally ordered the forced conversion of the nuns of the convent and that when they refused had them imprisoned, starved, flogged, sexually assaulted, and repeatedly tortured. She gave a detailed and graphic account of these events, causing outrage in Rome, while the account was further publicised by aristocratic Polish refugees in Paris. Within Polish Romantic literature, both Juliusz Słowacki and Stanisław Wyspiański made Mother Makrina the subject of immortal works of Polish poetry. Although Russian Foreign Office diplomats and Metropolitan bishop Yosyf Semashko himself adamantly denied Mother Makrina's story, it was widely believed, including by Pope Gregory XVI and his successor Pius IX. Over the course of the following decades, her story of the Nuns of Minsk was regularly reprinted as far as Ireland and North America. In 1923 the Jesuit scholar Fr. Jan Urban wrote a book in which he investigated the account of Mother Makrina Mieczyslavska and concluded that it was a fabrication and that Mother Makrina was, "an imposter."

In 1966, however, historian Wasyl Lencyk wrote, "In favor of her trustworthiness, Fr. Edmund Maykowski published some documents, namely her correspondence with Cardinal Ledochovski and the official report of the commission appointed by the Archbishop of Poznan Przyluski. Important in this matter is a medical report signed by two respected physicians of Poznan, Dr. Kramarkewicz and Dr. Jagielski, who gave her medical care after she escaped from Russia. The documents speak in favor of Mieczyslavska, nevertheless her story cannot be proved with certainty though it was very possible under the existing conditions in Russia."

Accounts of Metropolitan Yosyf Semashko's strained family ties were also circulated. In particular, Fr. Yosyf Semashko continued to offer Greek Catholic liturgy into the 1840s and only adopted Orthodox liturgical books after his famous son transferred him from his old Ukrainian parish to the parish of Dzikuški, close to the Metropolitan seat in Vilnius. It has been alleged that this transfer was not entirely voluntary and that Father Yosyf never approved of the anti-Catholicism of his famous son.

In the contemporary Belarusian exarchate of the Moscow Patriarchate, Semashko is a figure of veneration. The year 2018, the 220th anniversary of his birth, was declared to be the year of Metropolitan Yosyf. Moreover, it was stated that proceedings should begin to declare Metropolitan Yosyf a saint of the Belarusian Orthodox Church, though it is unclear at what stage are the proceedings at present.

After the collapse of the Soviet Union and the revivals of the Ukrainian Greek Catholic Church and the Ruthenian Greek Catholic Church, and to a lesser extent of the Belarusian Greek Catholic Church, the legacy of Semashko has also been reexamined by historians of the Eastern Catholic Churches. Within Eastern Catholic circles, and particularly among Belarusian and Ukrainian nationalist historians, Semashko is viewed as an enforcer of Caesaropapism, linguistic imperialism, and forced conversions of the Ruthenian people, and both his Russophilic views and his autocratic methods are widely decried by Catholics.

Wasyl Lencyk alleged that the real reason for the Synod of Polotsk was because, "The Uniat Church by the very fact of her existence made the White-Ruthenian and Ukrainian peoples separate and distinct from the Russian people; thus she must be removed in order to facilitate the full Russification of these two Slav nations."
