= Liavoncij Tumouski =

Belarusian Greek Catholic apostolic administrator (born 1973)

The Reverend Liavoncij Tumouski M.S.U.
- Apostolic Administrator for the Byzantine Rite Catholics in Belarus
- Native name: Лявонцій Тумоўскі
- Church: Belarusian Greek Catholic Church
- Appointed: 14 September 2026
- Predecessor: Sergiusz Gajek

Orders
- Ordination: 18 May 2003 by Julian Gbur

Personal details
- Born: Aliaksandr Tumouski; 9 July 1973 (age 53) Polotsk, Byelorussian SSR, Soviet Union
- Education: Ukrainian Catholic University; Pontifical Oriental Institute

Liavoncij Aliaksandr Tumouski M.S.U. (born 9 July 1973) is a Belarusian Eastern Catholic priest of the Studite tradition. Since 14 September 2026, he has served as the apostolic administrator of the Belarusian Greek Catholic Church which is a sui iuris (independent) Eastern Catholic Church on the territory of Belarus, succeeding Sergiusz Gajek.

== Early life and education ==
Tumouski was born on 9 July 1973 in Polotsk, in Belarus. In 1995 he entered the Monastery of the Studite Monks at the Univ Lavra in Ukraine. He made his simple vows on 13 July 1997 and his solemn vows on 27 August 2000.

He studied philosophy and theology at the Major Seminary in Lviv and at the Ukrainian Catholic University, where he obtained a master's degree in theology. From 2008 to 2018 he continued his studies in Rome, obtaining a licentiate and subsequently a doctorate in theology at the Pontifical Oriental Institute.

== Priesthood and ministry ==
Tumouski was ordained a deacon on 28 August 2002 and a hieromonk on 18 May 2003. His priestly ministry has been associated with the Belarusian Greek Catholic community and with the pastoral work of the Studite monks. He served as prior of the Monastery of Saints Borys and Hleb in Polotsk from 2003 to 2008. During the same period he held leadership positions within the Belarusian Greek Catholic parish structure, including vice-dean of its parishes from 2004 to 2006 and dean of the Eastern Protopresbyterate from 2006 to 2008.

In 2015, Tumouski was responsible for the pastoral care of Ukrainian Byzantine Rite faithful in Greece. From 2022, he served as the person responsible for the pastoral care of the faithful of the Belarusian Greek Catholic Church in Poland.

== Apostolic administrator in Belarus ==
On 14 September 2026, Pope Leo XIV accepted the resignation of Archimandrite Jan Sergiusz Gajek as apostolic administrator for the Catholic faithful of the Byzantine Rite in Belarus and appointed Tumouski to succeed him. The appointment made Tumouski the head of the Apostolic Administration for the Faithful of Byzantine Rite in Belarus, an ecclesiastical jurisdiction established by Pope Francis in 2023.

The Belarusian Greek Catholic community is one of the smaller Eastern Catholic communities in Belarus. The Apostolic Administration was established in March 2023, when Gajek, who had served as apostolic visitor to the Belarusian Byzantine Catholic faithful since 1993, became its first apostolic administrator.

At the time of Tumouski's appointment, reporting described the Belarusian Greek Catholic community as having approximately 5,000 faithful in Belarus, with additional members in the diaspora. The community's contemporary institutional situation has been affected by Belarusian regulations governing the registration of religious organizations; reporting in 2026 noted that several Byzantine Rite parishes had lost or been denied registration.

Tumouski's appointment was reported by Vatican News as a transition from Gajek, who had led the Belarusian Byzantine Catholic community in various capacities for more than three decades. His appointment was also reported by Belarusian independent media.
