= Maryla Szymiczkowa =

Literary nickname for duo of Jacek Dehnel and Piotr Tarczyński

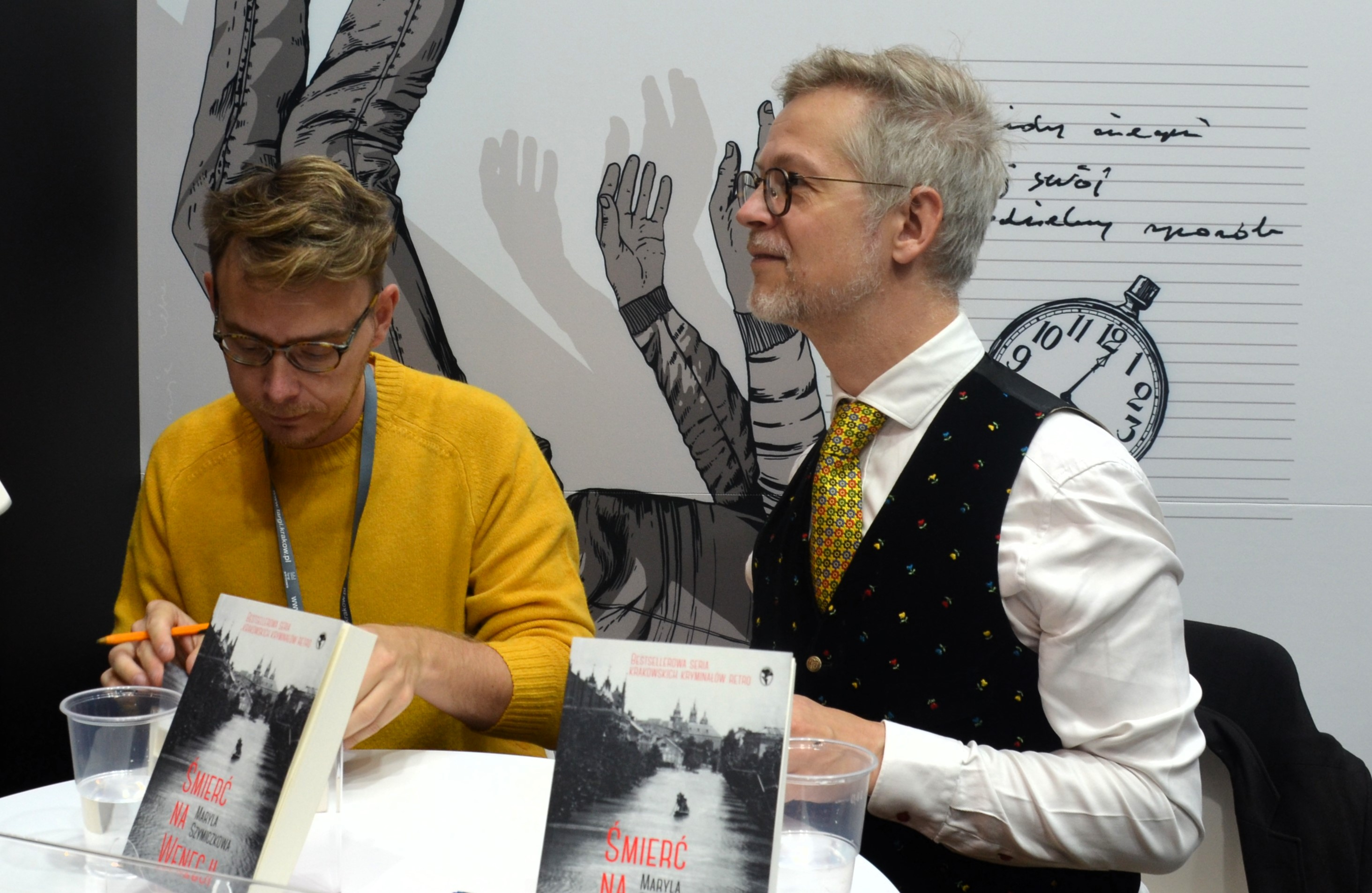
Writers Piotr Tarczyński and Jacek Dehnel

Maryla Szymiczkowa is a literary nickname for a writers duo of Jacek Dehnel and Piotr Tarczyński.

== Books ==
- Tajemnica domu Helclów. Kraków: Społeczny Instytut Wydawniczy „Znak”. 2015. ISBN 9788324035052.
- Rozdarta zasłona. Kraków: Społeczny Instytut Wydawniczy „Znak”. 2016. ISBN 9788324036875.
- Seans w Domu Egipskim. Kraków: Znak Litera Nova – Społeczny Instytut Wydawniczy „Znak”. 2018. ISBN 9788324047857.
- Złoty róg. Kraków: Społeczny Instytut Wydawniczy „Znak”. 2020. ISBN 9788324071111.
- Śmierć na Wenecji. Kraków: Społeczny Instytut Wydawniczy „Znak”. 2023. ISBN 978-83-240-7473-0.
- Szaleństwo i śmierć spłyną z gór. Kraków: Społeczny Instytut Wydawniczy "Znak". 2025. ISBN 9788324096633.

== Awards ==
- Kraków Book of the Month Award for Tajemnica domu Helclów (October 2015)
