= National Shrine of The Divine Mercy (Stockbridge, Massachusetts) =

Catholic shrine in Stockbridge, Massachusetts, US

Coordinates: 42°17′19.51″N 73°18′39.99″W

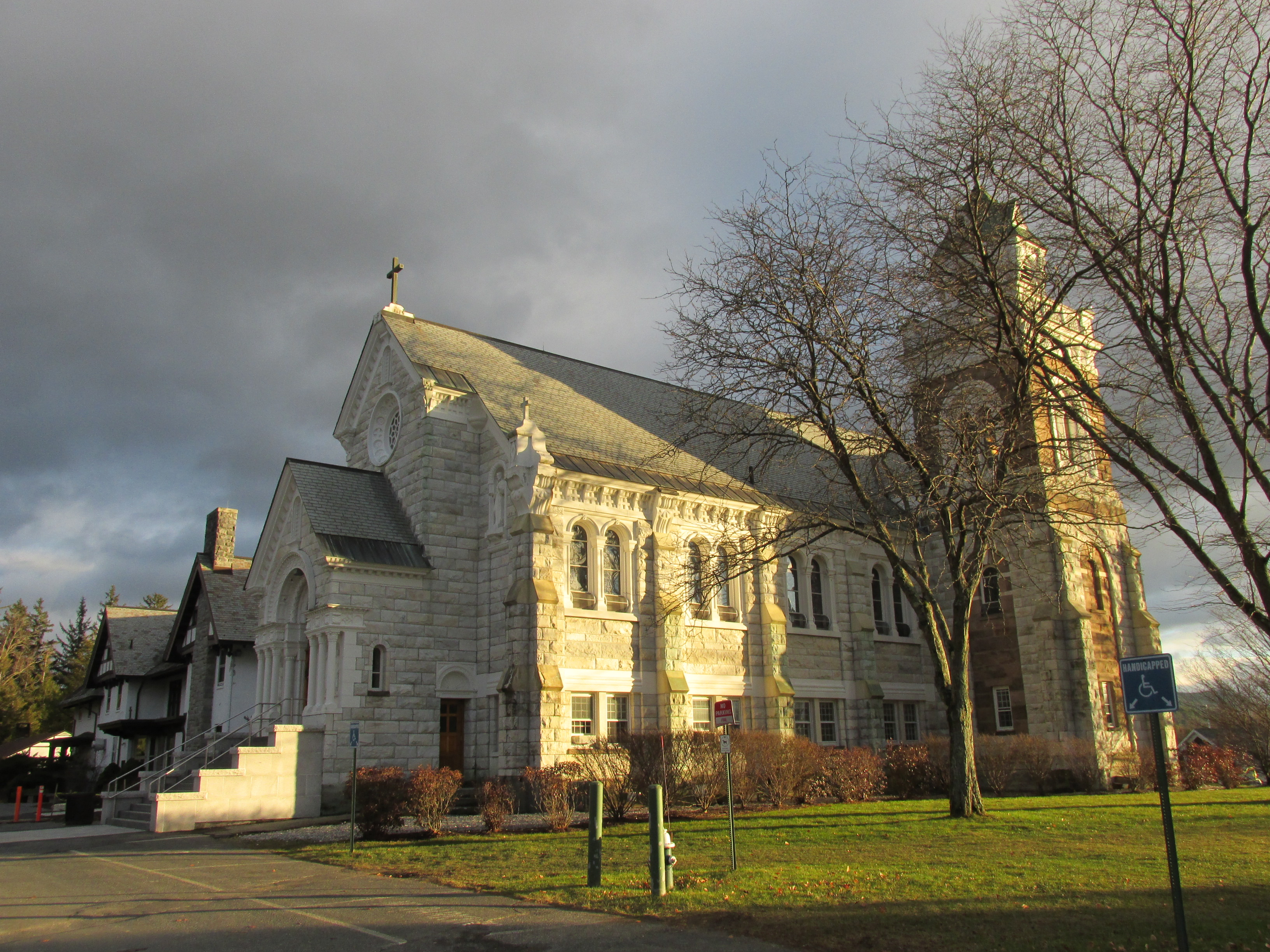
Exterior of the National Shrine of The Divine Mercy

The National Shrine of The Divine Mercy is a Catholic shrine located in Stockbridge, Massachusetts.

The priests and brothers of the Congregation of Marian Fathers of the Conception of the Most Blessed Virgin Mary have resided on Eden Hill in Stockbridge, since June 1944. Father Walter Pelczynski, MIC, with the assistance of local clergy and friends of the Marian community, initially purchased 50 of the 370 acres (1.5 km^{2}) that constituted the "Eden Hill" estate in November, 1943. The house was to serve as the novitiate for a newly formed province. An image of "The Divine Mercy" was enshrined in one of the small chapels where the members of the community prayed daily a perpetual novena to the Divine Mercy.

Pilgrims began to arrive the very next spring to celebrate the Feast of The Divine Mercy (the Sunday after Easter). By the end of World War II in 1945, pilgrims in growing numbers came to offer thanksgiving for graces received through the Divine Mercy message and devotion. They urged the Marians to build a shrine to Jesus, The Divine Mercy, as a votive of thanks. The Fathers decided to accede to the requests since there was also a need for a larger chapel to accommodate a growing community.

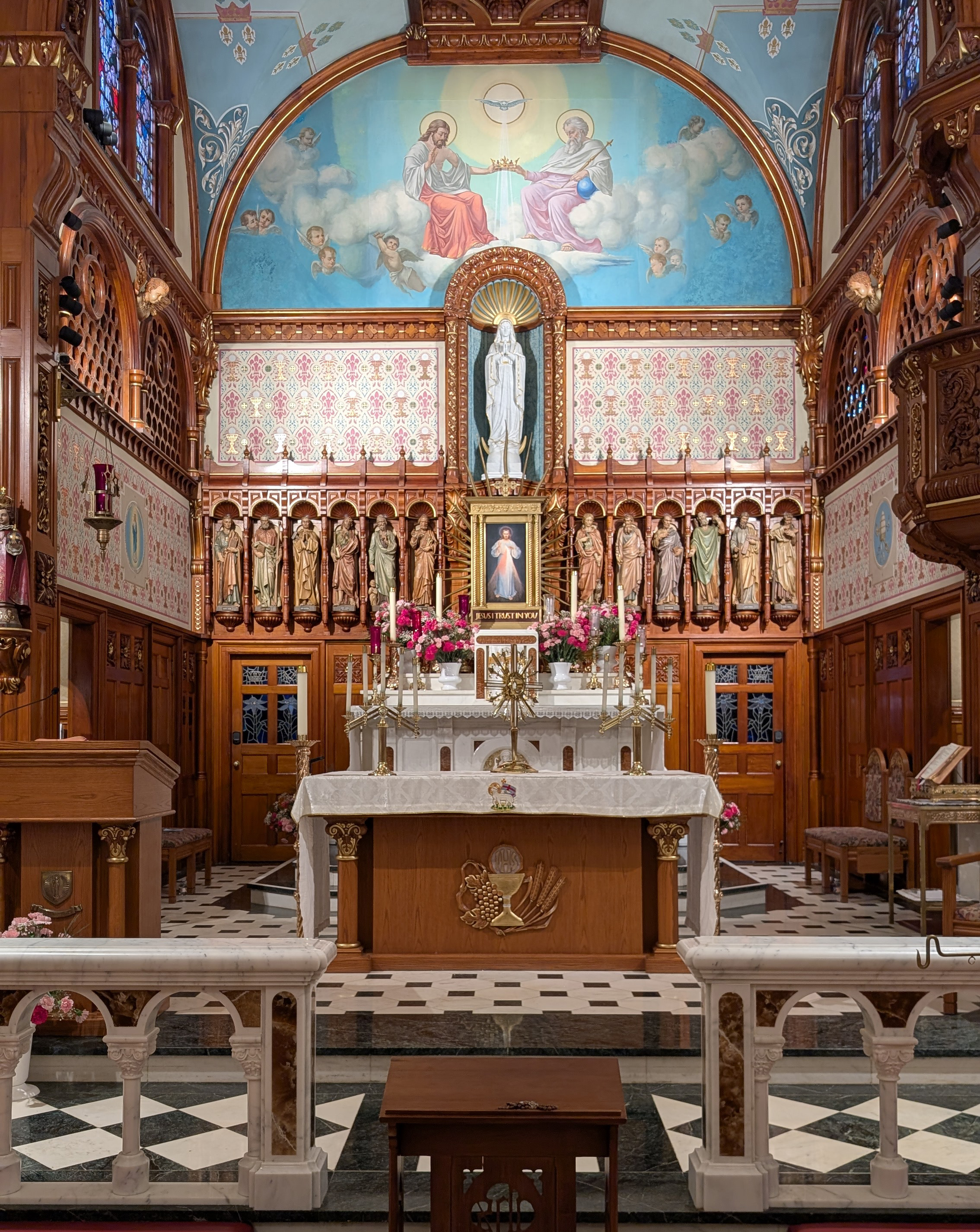
Altar and Sanctuary of the National Shrine of The Divine Mercy

The construction of the present Shrine began in 1950 and was completed and solemnly dedicated by Springfield Bishop Christopher Weldon in 1960. In 1996, the United States Conference of Catholic Bishops declared it a National Shrine in accord with Church law. The National Shrine has drawn thousands of pilgrims from around the world.

== See also ==
- Faustina Kowalska
- National Shrine of The Divine Mercy (Philippines)
- Divine Mercy Sanctuary (Kraków)
