= Synod of Polotsk =

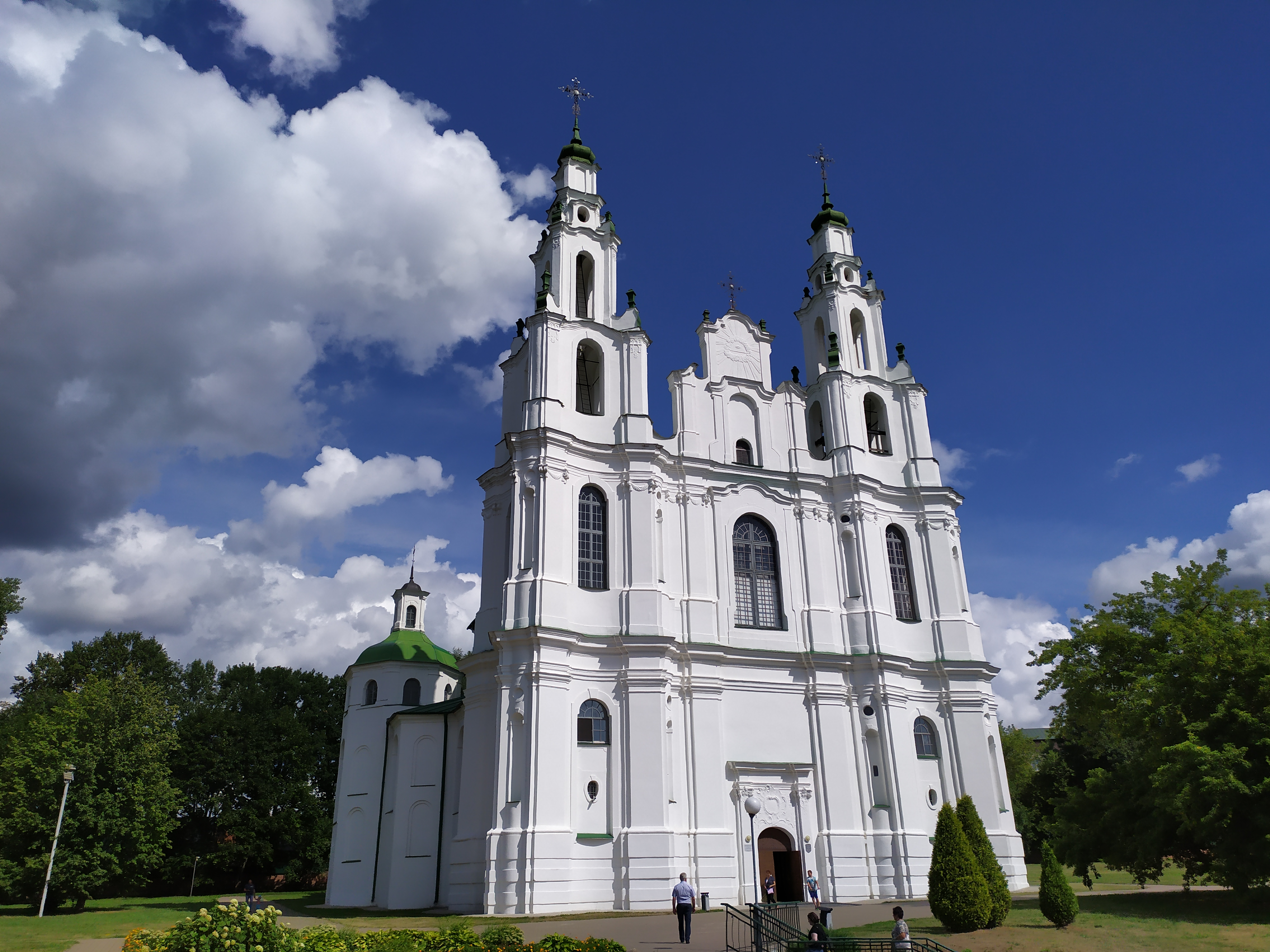
Former Uniate Cathedral of Holy Wisdom in Polotsk where the Synod was held.

The Synod of Polotsk was a local synod held on February 12, 1839, by the clergy of the Ruthenian Greek Catholic Church in the city of Polotsk for reunification with the Russian Orthodox Church. Polotsk was the center of the Greek Catholic Archeparchy of Polotsk-Vitebsk, the metropolitan seat of all Greek Catholics after the partition of the Polish-Lithuanian Commonwealth.

The Synod of Polotsk was the culmination of the plans for reunification with the Russian Orthodox Church starting from to-be Metropolitan Joseph (Semashko), a Russophile Greek Catholic protopresbyter, who presented a document to Emperor Nicholas I of Russia with a draft ("About the situation of the Uniate Church in Russia and the means to return it to the bosom of the Orthodox Church") outlining the gradual rejoining of the Greek Catholic Church within the Russian Empire to the Russian Orthodox Church on January 17, 1828.

The resolution of the Synod of Polotsk led to the Russian Orthodox Church immediately gaining 1607 formerly Greek Catholic parishes and 1.2 million new faithful under its jurisdiction. The exception to the Polotsk Synod was the Ruthenian Greek Catholic Eparchy of Chełm (because it wasn't in the Russian Empire but in the Congress Kingdom of Poland), which was not terminated until 1875 by the Russophiles. The Greek-Catholic eparchies in the Kingdom of Galicia and Lodomeria (in the Austrian Empire) continued the Ruthenian Uniate Church and the Union of Brest.

== History ==
=== Background ===
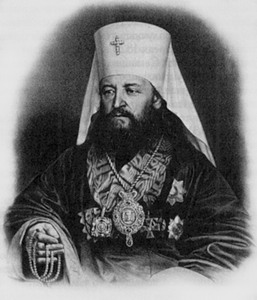
Bishop Joseph (Semashko)

Russian officials always viewed the Uniate churches to be of a great threat to internal stability in the newly conquered lands from the weakening Poland-Lithuania due to fears of it being a nest for irredentist and anti-Russian activity, actively suppressing it. During the Great Northern War, Russian troops occupied the area of Volhynia and converted all the Greek Catholic parishes they occupied to Russian Orthodox, converting back to Greek Catholicism once the occupation ended.

Suppression did not truly begin until the partitions of the Polish–Lithuanian Commonwealth. The Greek Catholic Metropolitan of Kiev's was terminated, and the eparchies were cut down from six to four. However, after these actions, active suppression of the Greek Catholic Church was not pursued until Emperor Nicholas I's 1828 decree on the gradual dismantlement of the Greek Catholic churches within the Russian Empire, based on protopresbyter Joseph (Semashko)'s proposal earlier in the year. The results from this decree led to the separation of the Greek Catholic's from the Roman Catholic Ecclesiastical College, of which Father Joseph (Semashko) was appointed to, with a Russian-appointed Greek Catholic Metropolitan of Kiev as its head, Metropolitan Josaphat (Bulhak). Further results from the decree were the eparchies being cut down again from four to two, and the establishment of Orthodox-led seminaries to teach new Greek Catholic priests, swaying the next generation to Orthodoxy and eventual reunification.

The establishment of the Greek Catholic Ecclesiastical College, under direction from Joseph (Semashko), led to the removal of instruments from the Divine Liturgy, enforcement of services according to Muscovite service books, and the erection of iconostases. It was noted that Joseph (Semashko) would visit Greek Catholic parishes and engage into fierce debates on the union with Rome with the local priests. Furthermore, a prohibition was established for Greek Catholics attempting to convert to Roman Catholicism in advance for the future unrest that would be caused. In 1833, Joseph (Semashko) requested to convert himself into the Russian Orthodox Church, but the Most Holy Synod refused, stating he was too valuable to the reunification process.

=== Further measures ===
In 1835, measures were taken to further weaken the Greek Catholic Church. The Russian government established a new 'Secret Committee for the Uniate Confession', including now, among others, Greek Catholic Bishop of Lithuania Joseph (Semashko), Russian Orthodox Metropolitan of Moscow Philaret (Drozdov), Greek Catholic Metropolitan of Kiev Josaphat (Bulhak), Chief Prosecutor of the Most Holy Synod Stepan Nechayev, and the Minister of Internal Affairs, Count Dmitry Bludov. This committee devised a plan to formalize reunification of the Greek Catholic Church to the Russian Orthodox Church, most notably taking Joseph's (Semashko) previously established Greek Catholic Ecclesiastical College from the Russian Department of Foreign Confessions and placing it under direct authority of the Orthodox Most Holy Synod. The four eparchies were also cut down once more, into two, one White Russian (Belorussian) and the other being a Lithuanian eparchy.

In 1838, the two main opponents to the reunification process, the Greek Catholic Metropolitan of Kiev Josephat (Bulgak) and his vicar, Bishop Josephat (Zharskiy) both died. Naturally, Bishop Joseph (Semashko) took over as head of the Greek Catholic Ecclesiastical College and the leadership of the committee. This opportune sequence of events allowed for the Secret Committee to launch the final step of the reunification process, the Synod itself. Coincided with this, the Greek Catholic Collegium prepared the collection of 1,305 letters of Greek Catholic clergy expressing their desires to union with the Russian Orthodox Church between 1837 and 1838.

=== The Synod ===
On February 24, 1839 [O.S. February 12], at the Cathedral of Holy Wisdom in Polotsk, during the Sunday of the Triumph of Orthodoxy (First Sunday of Lent), the Synod was opened after Divine Liturgy that day. The 29th Don Cossack Regiment was sent to keep guard during the synod in case of agitation from the predetermined events that were to unfold. At the synod were Greek Catholic Bishop of Lithuania Joseph (Semashko), Greek Catholic Bishop of Orsha Vasiliy (Luzhinskiy), and the Vicar Bishop of Brest Antoniy (Zubko), alongside many other clergy and representatives of the laity.

The synod concluded on March 25, 1839 [O.S. March 13] for the request of annexation of the Ruthenian Greek Catholic Church's land to the Russian Orthodox Church and termination of the 1596 Union of Brest within the Russian Empire. The 1,305 letters were attached to this request to the Emperor. This request was accepted by Emperor Nicholas I on April 6 [O.S. March 25], of the same year.

Bishop Joseph (Semashko) had this to say on the matter regarding the events of the synod,

...since childhood I have had... a spiritual attraction to Russia and everything Russian... The immeasurable Russia, bound by one faith, one language, guided to a good purpose by one will, became for me a flattering, great fatherland, to whose service, whose good I considered for myself a sacred duty to promote – this is the force that moved me to the reunion of the Uniates, rejected in troubled times from the magnificent Russian Orthodox tree... A fervent zeal for this cause for 12 years [1827-1839] has befallen my entire existence.

On April 11, 1839 [O.S. March 30], the Greek Catholic Ecclesiastical College was renamed the White Russian-Lithuanian Ecclesiastical College, with Bishop Joseph (Semashko) as its chairman and elevated to the rank of Archbishop, Metropolitan of Lithuania and White Russia.

== See also ==
- Union of Brest
- Union of Uzhhorod
- Ruthenian Uniate Church
- Ruthenian Greek Catholic Church
- Belarusian Greek Catholic Church
- Belarusian Orthodox Church
- Belarusian nationalism
- All-Russian nation
- Orthodoxy, Autocracy, and Nationality
