= Belarusian Greek Catholic Church =

Eastern Catholic church

- Беларуская Грэка-Каталіцкая Царква
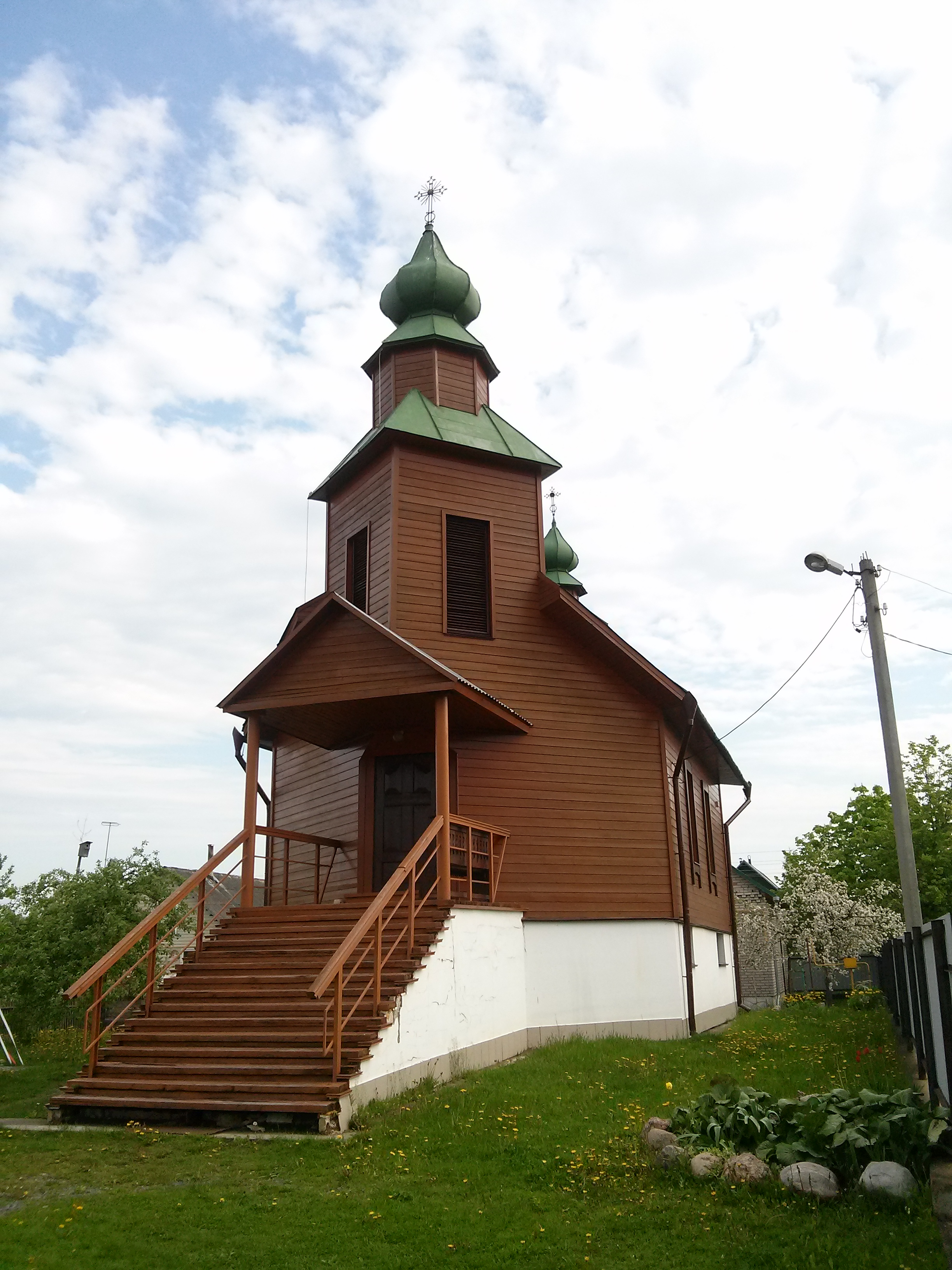
- Church of venerable Paraskieva of Polack, Polotsk
- Abbreviation: BGCC
- Type: Particular church (sui iuris)
- Classification: Christian, Catholic
- Orientation: Eastern Catholic
- Theology: Catholic theology
- Polity: Episcopal
- Governance: Apostolic Administration
- Pope: Leo XIV
- Apostolic administrator: Hieromonk Liavoncij Tumouski
- Priests: 16
- Parishes: 20
- Associations: Congregation for the Oriental Churches
- Region: Belarus and diaspora: Antwerp, Kaliningrad, London, Prague, Rome, Warsaw
- Liturgy: Byzantine Rite
- Headquarters: Church of St Cyril of Turau and All the Patron Saints of the Belarusian People, London, England, U.K. and Minsk, Belarus
- Origin: 1596 (first), 1990 (second); Polish–Lithuanian Commonwealth (first), Belarus (second)
- Separated from: Ruthenian Orthodox Church (first)
- Merger of: Union of Brest and Ruthenian Uniate Church (first)
- Defunct: 1839 (first)
- Members: c. 12,000

The Belarusian Greek Catholic Church, (Note: Belarusian: Беларуская грэка-каталіцкая царква, Bielaruskaja hreka-katalickaja carkva BHKC; Latin: Ecclesiae Graecae Catholico Belarusica) or the Belarusian Byzantine Catholic Church, is one of the 23 Eastern Catholic sui iuris particular churches that are in full communion with the Holy See. It is the heir within Belarus to the Union of Brest and the Ruthenian Uniate Church.

== History ==
Religions in Polish–Lithuanian Commonwealth in 1573: Catholic Orthodox Calvinist

Religions in Polish–Lithuanian Commonwealth in 1750: Latin Catholic Greek Catholic Orthodox

The Christians who, through the Union of Brest (1595–96), entered full communion with the See of Rome while keeping their Byzantine liturgy in the Church Slavonic language, were at first mainly Belarusian. The rise of Protestantism in the grand duchy and the growing power of the Russian Orthodox Church, which in 1589 was erected as an independent patriarchate, were two of the factors which led the Belarusian hierarchs to accept union with the See of Rome. Even after further Ukrainians joined the union around 1700, Belarusians still formed about half of the group. According to the historian Anatol Taras, by 1795, around 80% of Christians in Belarus were Greek Catholics, with 14% being Latin Catholics and 8% being Orthodox.

Four Uniate bishoprics existed in Brest, Polatsk, Smalensk and Pinsk and the Belarusian Uniate Church developed the individuality of its ritual and customs, as a blend of its dual Eastern and Western heritage. Prelates such as Leo Kiska (1668–1728) and other clergy used the vernacular, not only in their sermons, but also in their writings. Hymns (kantyčki), carols (kaladki) and prayers, as well as the catechism, were recited and taught in Belarusian. A whole corpus of Belarusian Church music for choir, cantor and even organ was evolved. In an age of increasing polonisation, the Uniate church played an invaluable role in preserving the integrity of Belarusian national culture.

=== Russian Empire ===
The partition of Poland–Lithuania and the incorporation of the whole of Belarus into Russia led, according to the Russian Orthodox Church, many Belarusians (1,553 priests, 2,603 parishes and 1,483,111 people) to unite, by March 1795, with the Russian Orthodox Church. Another source seems to contradict this, since it gives the number of parishes that came under Russian rule in 1772 only as "over 800", meaning that many priests and people remained in communion with Rome.

During the Napoleonic campaign in Belarus in 1812, a large number of Belarusian parishes reverted to the Uniate rite but after the defeat of the French several bishops were deprived of their sees and a fresh policy of enforced russification was initiated. Repressive measures were increased after the accession of Tsar Nicholas I. In 1826 the sale of Uniate service books was prohibited.

After the unsuccessful 1830–1831 November Uprising against Russian rule and the subsequent removal of the predominantly Catholic local nobility from influence in Belarusian society, the three bishops of the Church (led by Joseph Semashko), along with 21 priests, convoked in February 1839 a synod that was held in Polatsk on 25 March 1839. This officially brought 1,600,000 Christians and either 1,305 or some 2,500 priests to join the Russian Orthodox Church. This was preceded by confiscation and destruction of Belarusian service-books, chant-books and manuscripts and their replacement with official Russian Orthodox publications.

However, some priests and faithful still refused to join. The Russian state assigned most of the property to the Orthodox Church in the 1840s. Recalcitrant priests and parish clerks were deported to monasteries and penal colonies in Northern Russia, emigrated to Austrian Galicia or chose to practise in secret the now-forbidden religion. Resentment over the suppression of the Belarusian Uniate Church was one of the causes of the 1863 Uprising and used as a rallying cry by the uprising's leader on Belarusian lands Kastuś Kalinoŭski.

=== 20th century ===
When, in 1905, Tsar Nicholas II published a decree granting freedom of religion, as many as 230,000 Belarusians wanted union with Rome. However, since the government refused to allow them to form a Byzantine-Rite community, they joined the Latin Church, to which most Belarusian Catholics now belong.

Nevertheless, the wish to re-establish the Uniate church remained a powerful factor in the Belarusian national revival of the early 20th century. The newspaper Nasha Niva printed the Uniate feast days, the Belarusian writer and political leader Ivan Luckievič discussed the restoration of the Uniate church in Belarus with the Ukrainian Metropolitan Andrey Sheptytsky and one of the avowed objects of the Belarusian Democratic Union established in 1917 was the re-establishment of that rite.

After the First World War, the western part of Belarus was included in the reconstituted Polish state, and some 30,000 descendants of those who, less than a century before, had joined the Russian Orthodox Church joined the Catholic Church, while keeping their Byzantine liturgy. In 1931, the Holy See sent them a bishop as Apostolic Visitator. A Belarusian-language Uniate magazine was published by Fr Anton Niemancevič between 1932 and 1939. After the Soviet Union annexed West Belarus in 1939, Fr Niemancevič was appointed an exarch for the Belarusian Byzantine-Rite faithful in May 1940, but two years later, he was arrested and taken to a Soviet concentration camp, where he died.

==== Cold War ====
While from then on very little information about the Byzantine Catholics in Belarus could reach Rome, refugees from among them founded centres in western Europe (Paris, London and Louvain) and in parts of the United States of America, especially in Chicago. From 1947, Leo Haroshka initiated in Paris a pastoral and cultural periodical called Bozhym Shliakham (Божым Шляхам), which was published from 1960 to the end of 1980 in London. In London also, Alexander Nadson began translating the Byzantine liturgical texts into the Belarusian language in the 1970s. Thanks to this work, when in 1990 the first Greek-Catholic parishes could be organized in Belarus, they were able immediately to use these texts in their national language.

In 1960, the Holy See appointed Cheslau Sipovich as Apostolic Visitator for the Belarusian faithful abroad. He was the first Belarusian Catholic bishop since the Synod of Polatsk. A successor, Uladzimir Tarasevich, was appointed in 1983. After his death in 1986, Alexander Nadson was appointed Apostolic Visitator, but not, at his own request, raised to episcopal rank.

==== Dissolution of the Soviet Union ====
The 1980s saw a gradual increase in interest among Minsk intellectuals in the Greek-Catholic Church. Articles by Anatol Sidarevich and Jury Khadyka about its history appeared in the 1987–1988 issues of Litaratura i Mastastva. And in the autumn of 1989 some young intellectuals of Minsk decided to publish the periodical Unija intended to promote the rebirth of the Greek-Catholic Church.

In early 1990, Nadson brought humanitarian aid from Belarusians abroad to their compatriots at home still suffering as a result of the 1986 Chernobyl disaster. He was surprised to meet young Belarusians who said they were Greek Catholics. On 11 March, he celebrated Minsk's first Divine Liturgy in the national language, and, two days later, had a meeting with the editors of Unija, the first issue of which was then printed in Latvia.

September 1990 saw the registration of the first Greek-Catholic parish since the Second World War, and in early 1991 Jan Matusevich began to celebrate the liturgy in his Minsk apartment. He was later put in charge of all the Greek-Catholic parishes in Belarus, and died in 1998.

==== Republic of Belarus ====
By 1992, three priests and two deacons in Belarus were celebrating the Byzantine liturgy in Belarusian. The same year, a survey by Belarus State University found that 10,000 people in Minsk identified themselves as Greek Catholics. By 1993, it was estimated that the number of Greek Catholics in Belarus had grown to 100,000.

Extrapolated to the country as a whole, this was interpreted to mean that, especially among the intelligentsia and nationally conscious youth, some 120,000 Belarusians were in favour of a rebirth of the Greek-Catholic Church. Because of the lack of priests and churches this interest did not lead to membership.

In 1993, Pope John Paul II appointed Sergiusz Gajek M.I.C. as Apostolic Visitor for Greek Catholics in Belarus.

== Present situation ==
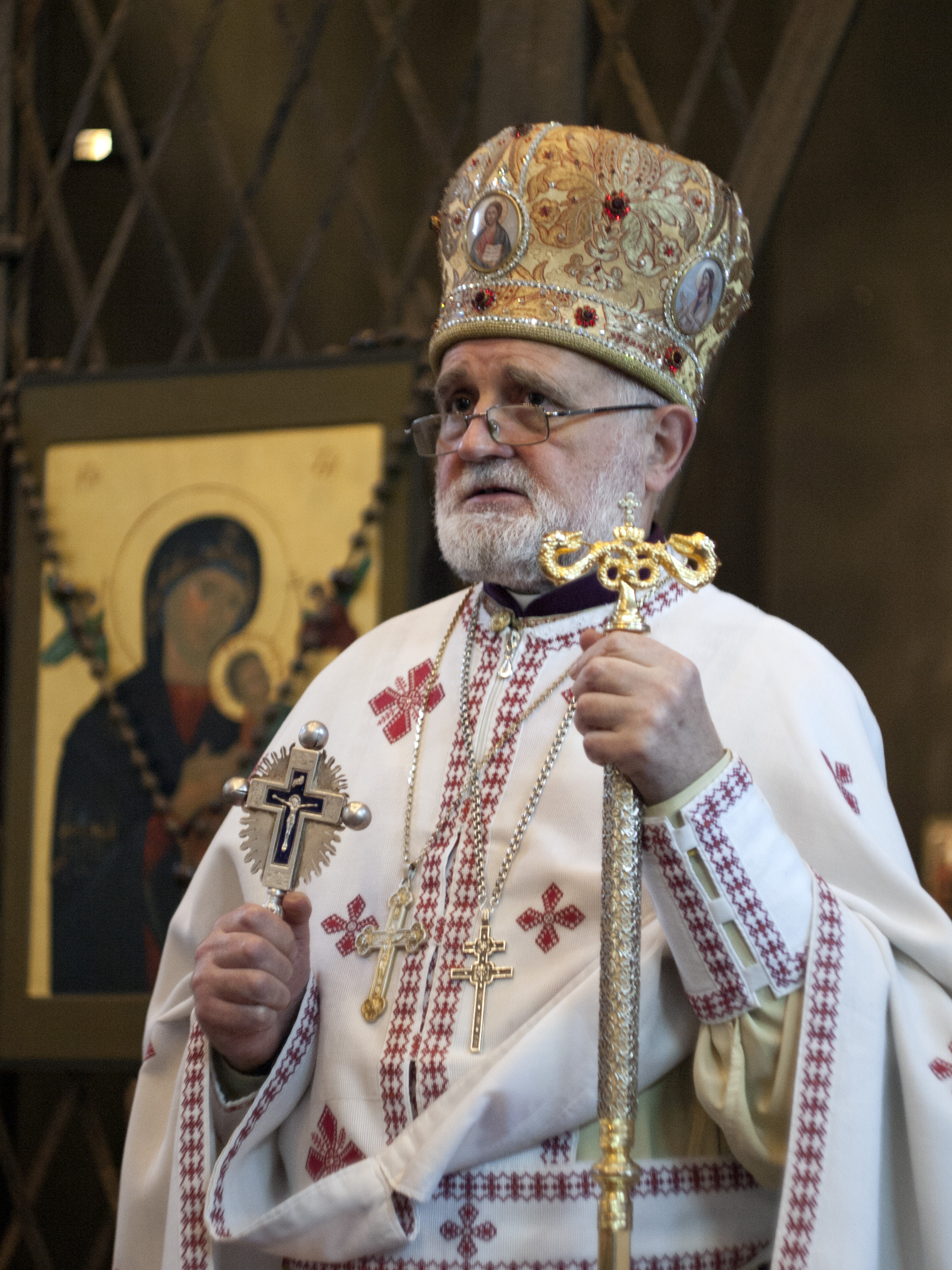
Archimandrit Sergiusz Gajek

=== In Belarus ===
At the beginning of 2015, the Belarusian Greek Catholic Church had 20 parishes, of which 18 had obtained state recognition. As of 2003, there have been two Belarusian Greek Catholic parishes in each of the following cities – Minsk, Polatsk and Vitsebsk; and only one in Brest, Hrodna, Mahiliou, Maladziechna and Lida. The faithful permanently attached to these came to about 3,000, while some 7,000 others lived outside the pastoral range of the parishes. Today there are 16 priests, and 9 seminarians. There was a small Studite monastery at Polatsk. The parishes are organized into two deaneries, each headed by a protopresbyter or archpriest.

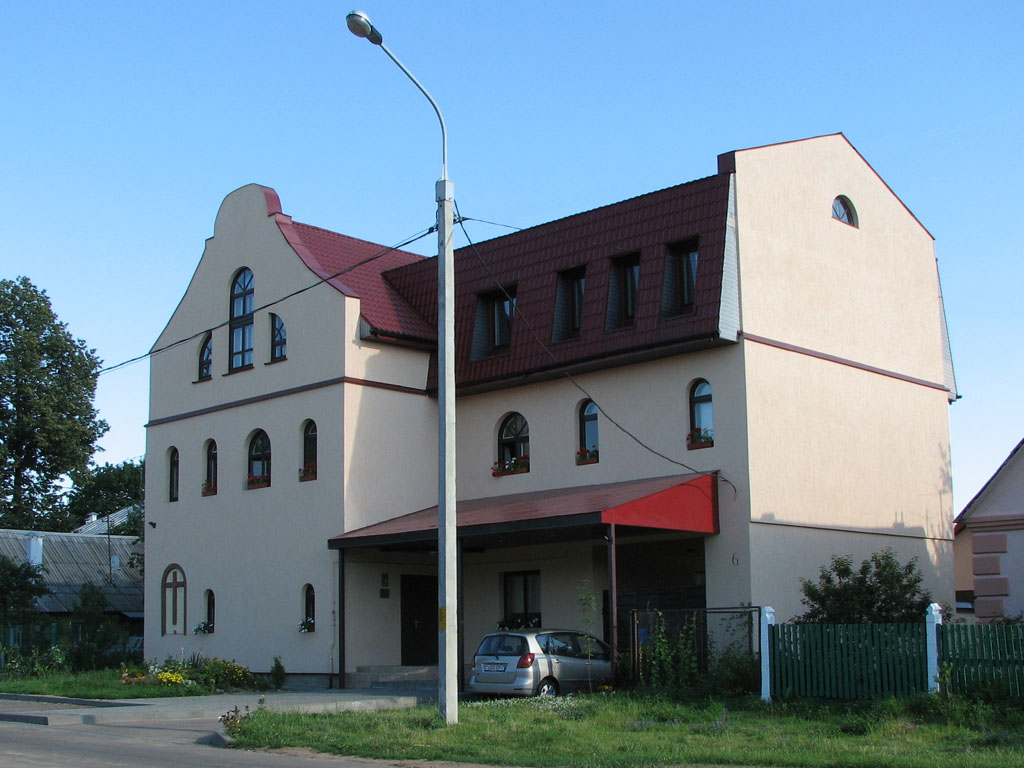
Belarusian Greek Catholic Centre of Saint Joseph in Minsk

Two of the parishes had small churches. Some of the others had pastoral centres with an oratory.

In March 2023, Pope Francis erected the apostolic administration for faithful of Byzantine rite in Belarus, appointing the Rt. Rev. Mitred Archimandrite Jan Sergiusz Gajek, M.I.C., (until then apostolic visitator) as apostolic administrator without episcopal rank.

By 2026, the Belarusian government had removed legal recognition of all Greek Catholic parishes in Brest region.

On 14 September 2026, Archimandrite Jan Sergiusz Gajek, M.I.C. retired as Apostolic Administrator, and was replaced by Fr. Liavoncij Tumouski, M.S.U..

=== Overseas ===
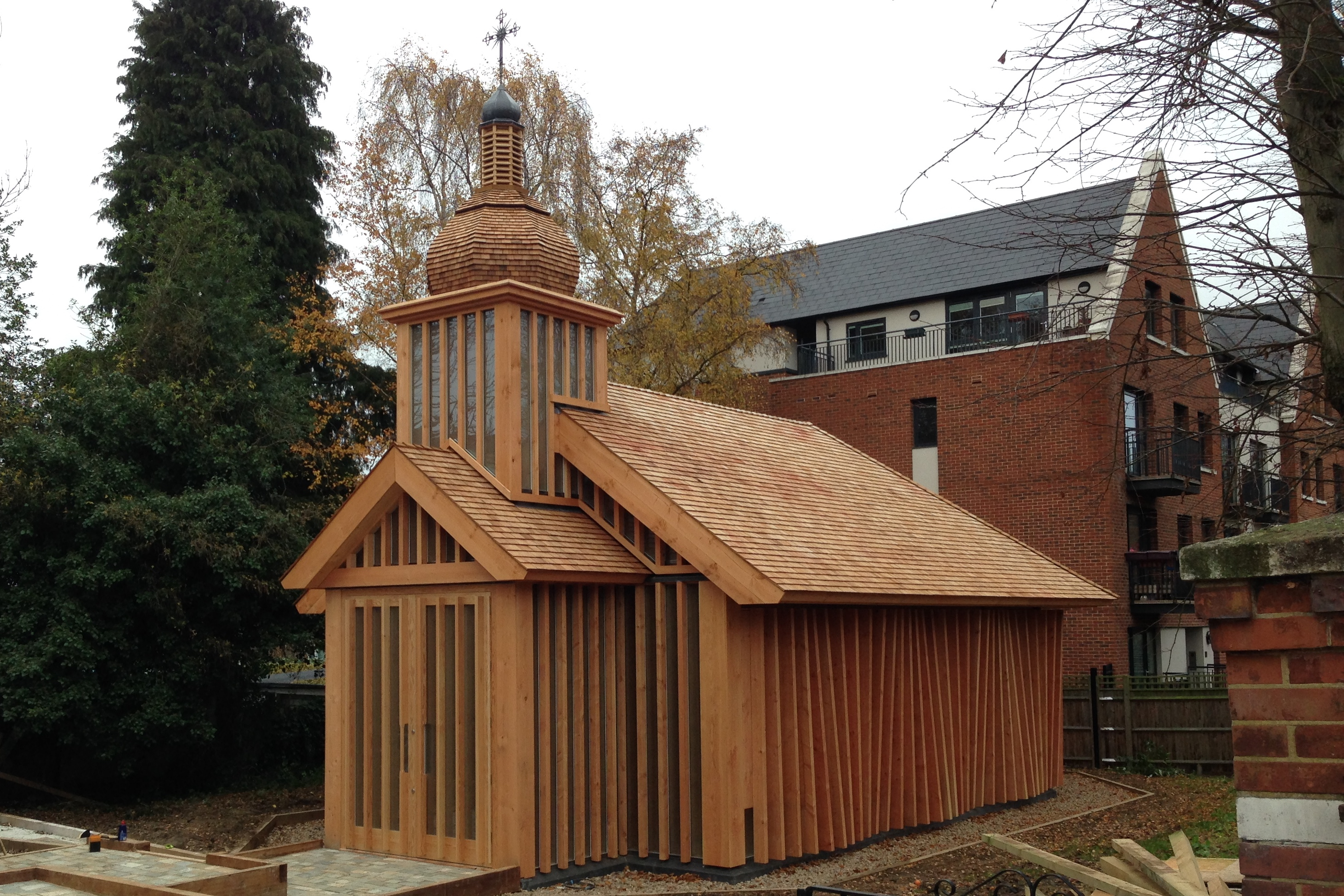
Church of St Cyril of Turau and All the Patron Saints of the Belarusian People, London

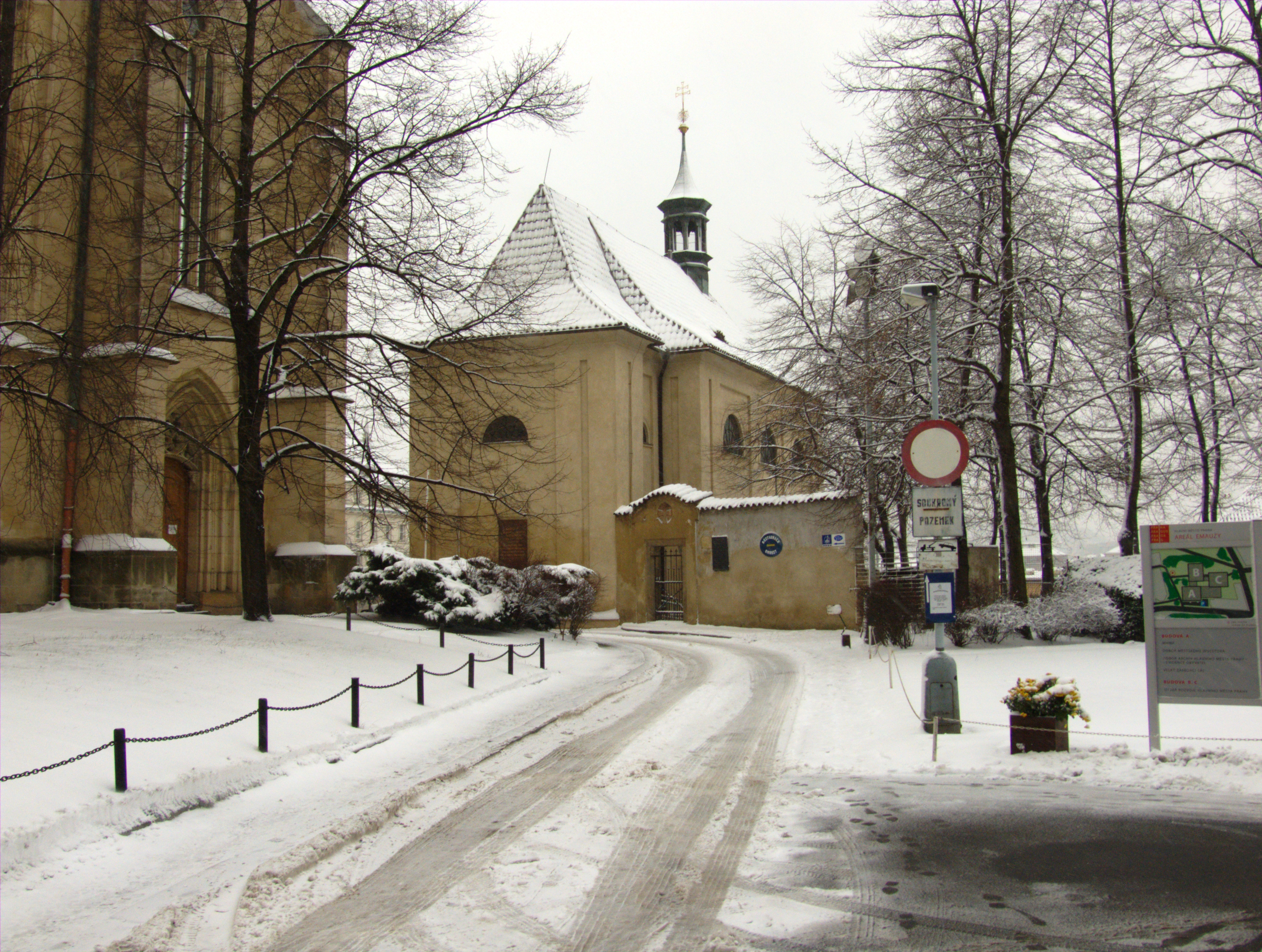
Chapel of Saints Cosmas and Damian, Prague

The chief Belarusian Greek Catholics overseas centres are the Church of St Cyril of Turau and All the Patron Saints of the Belarusian People in London and parish in Antwerp (constituted in 2003). Members, numbering about 2,000, were under the care of Mitred Protopresbyter Alexander Nadson as Apostolic Visitator until his death in 2015.

A parish in Chicago, that of Christ the Redeemer, existed from 1955 to 2003. It was founded by John Chrysostom Tarasevich and was served by Deacon Vasili von Burman, a noted historian of the Russian Greek Catholic Church. Christ the Redeemer was later the home parish of Uladzimir (Vladimir) Tarasevich until his death, after which it was administered by the local Latin Catholic ordinary, who appointed first Joseph Cirou and then John Mcdonnell as administrators. On 7 September 1996, the parish had seen the ordination of Prince Michael Huskey EOHS as the first Belarusian deacon in the United States. Michael served in the parish until it was closed by Cardinal Francis George, Archbishop of Chicago, on 20 July 2003.

== See also ==
- Belarusian Autocephalous Orthodox Church
- Catholic Church in Belarus
- Synod of Polotsk

== Sources ==
- Belarusian Catholic Mission (Byzantine rite) in London
- History of the Greek Catholic Church in Belarus by Alexander Nadson
- The history of the Uniate Church and its disestablishment in the 19th century.
- Oriente Cattolico (Vatican City: The Sacred Congregation for the Eastern Churches, 1974)
- Annuario Pontificio
- Ronald Roberson, CSP, The Eastern Christian Churches: A Brief Survey (6th edition); 1999; Edizioni Orientalia Christiana, Pontificio Istituto Orientale; Rome, Italy; ISBN 88-7210-321-5
- Archimandrite Siarhiej Hajek, The Belarusian Greek Catholic Church Yesterday and Today (Greek translation published in instalments on Καθολική (Athens), beginning with the issue of 25 July 2006)
- 1780—1800-я гады: рэлігійная канверсія беларускіх уніятаў
