= Yan Matusevich =

Belarusian priest (1946–1998)

- Ян Матусевіч
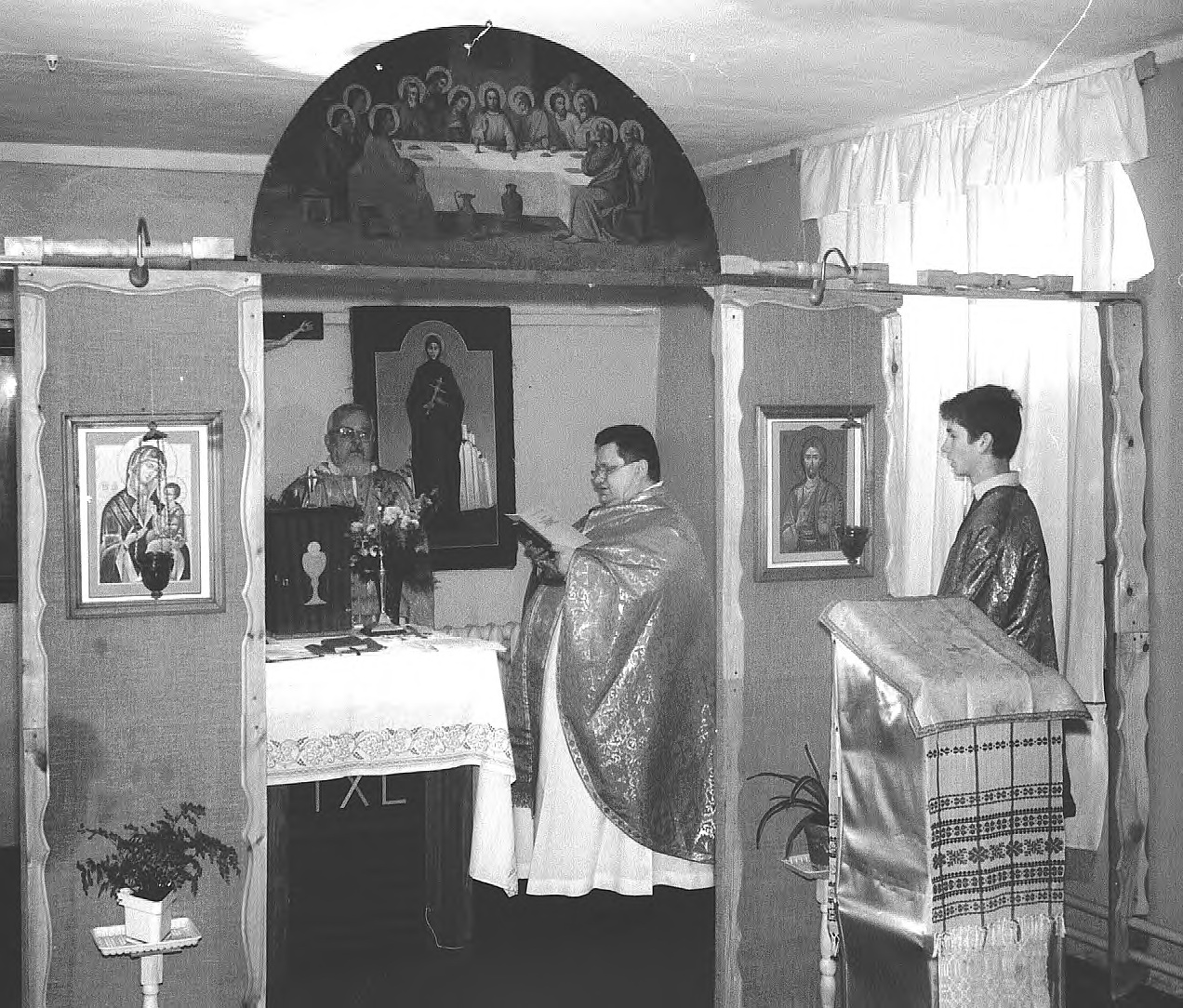
- Alexander Nadson and Jan Matusevič
- Born: July 24, 1946; Komenka village, Minsk Region
- Died: September 2, 1998 (aged 52); Minsk, Belarus
- Occupation: Catholic priest
- Known for: the first dean of the modern Belarusian Greek Catholic Church

Father Yan Matusevich (Belarusian: Ян Матусевіч, Jan Matusievič, 24 July 1946 – 2 September 1998) was a bi-ritualist Belarusian Catholic priest, and the first dean of the modern Belarusian Greek Catholic Church, "[which] revival [in the late 20th century] ... in Belarus and especially in Minsk began with him".

== Early years ==
Matusevich was born in the village of Komenka, Minsk Region, Soviet Belarus, into an Orthodox family with Uniate roots.

After high school, he studied at the Belarusian State Theatre and Art Institute, in the directing department. In 1972, he entered into the Orthodox Seminary in Smolensk. From 1974 to 1979, Matusevich worked in Smolensk, and then in the village of Markovo, Maladziečna District, in the Minsk region. In 1979, Matusevich joined the Catholic Church. For the next 11 years, he was rector of the Catholic parish in Barun.

== Involvement in revival of Belarusian Greek Catholic Church ==
In 1988, Matusevich became one of the first to preach in the Belarusian language, which attracted a number of intellectuals and young people from all over Belarus on the wave of the national revival. On 12 November 1989, Barun commemorated Saint Josaphat, the event is considered the first action of the modern Uniate Church in Minsk.

Starting in 1990, he was the rector of the Greek-Catholic parish of Saint Joseph, in Minsk. Matusevich consecrated a cross in Kurapaty, the site of mass executions by the NKVD in Soviet Belarus in the 1930s. In April 1989, he took part in the action of the Belarusian opposition, "Chernobyl Way". Matusevich was a board member of the Association of the Belarusian Language in Minsk, a board member and one of the founders of the Belarusian Bible Society and a pastor in the local Scout movement.

Matusevich is regarded as someone who "brought up a whole cohort of Belarusian Uniate priests".

== Death and resting place ==
Matusevich died in Minsk, Belarus, on 2 September 1998. The funeral service was held in the Church of Saints Simon and Helena and he was buried in the local Calvary Cemetery.

== Notable quotes ==
"If you do something with God, this work will advance, and if without God, this work will perish."

== See also ==
- Catholic Church in Belarus

== Other sources ==
- "Pamyatsі svyatara" / / Ave Maria. - Minsk: 2008. - number 10. - S. 27.
- Aytsets Ian Matusevіch. adchuў I Boskae paklіkanne / / Tsarkva . - Berastse: 1998. - No. 2 (17). - pp. 8–9.
