= Sergiusz Gajek =

Belarusian Greek Catholic priest

Jan Sergiusz Gajek M.I.C.
- Apostolic administrator emeritus of Belarusian Greek Catholic Church
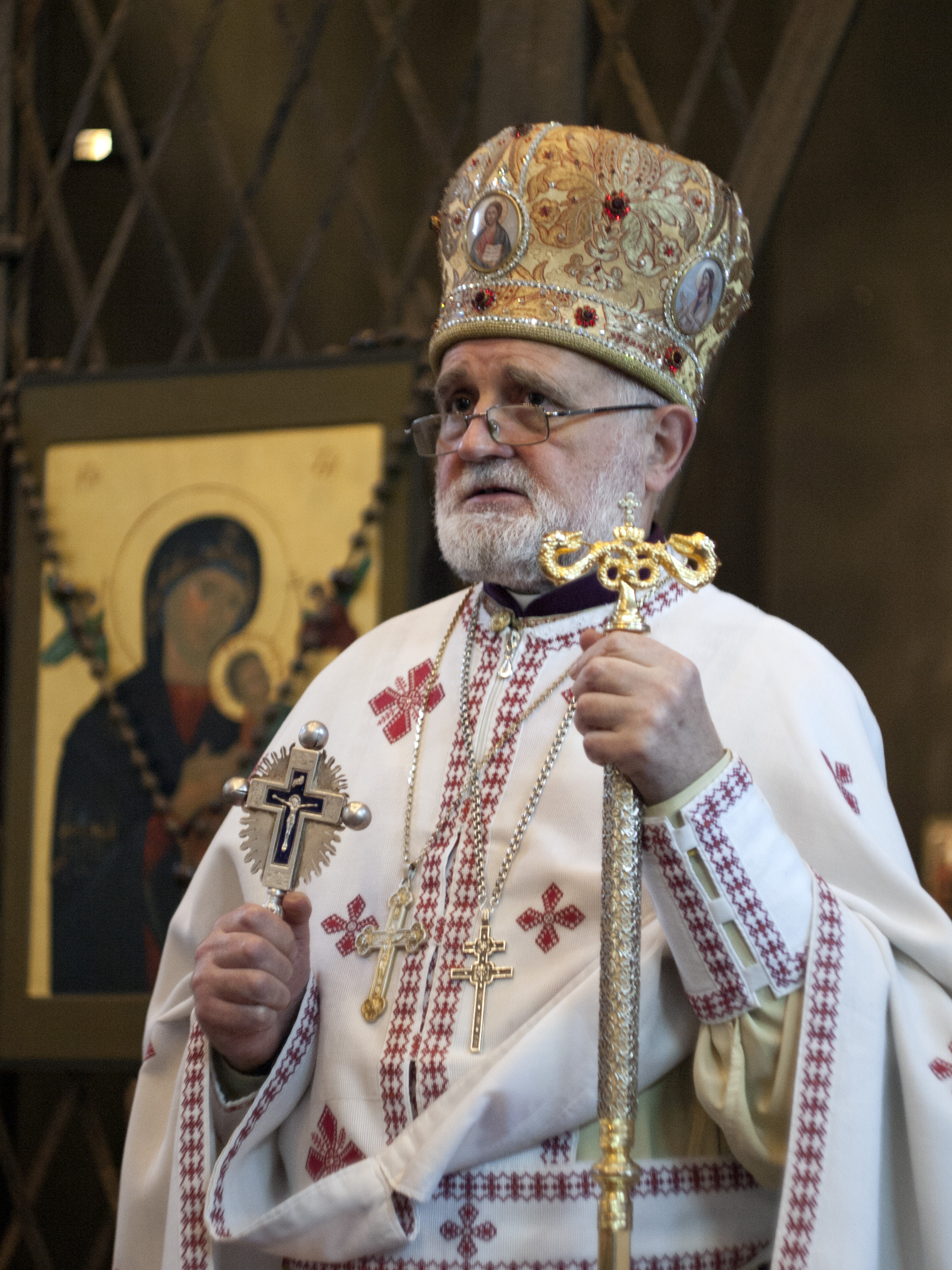
- Church: Catholic Church
- Appointed: 30 March 2023
- Term ended: 14 September 2026
- Successor: Liavoncij Tumouski
- Previous post: Apostolic Visitator (1994-2023)

Orders
- Ordination: 23 June 1974

Personal details
- Born: 8 February 1949 (age 77) Łyszkowice, Polish People's Republic (now Republic of Poland)

Jan Sergiusz Gajek (Belarusian: Сяргей Гаек, romanized: Siarhiej Hajek; born Jan Gajek on 2 February 1949) was until September 2026 the Apostolic Administrator of the Belarusian Greek Catholic Church which is a sui iuris (independent) Eastern Catholic Church on the territory of Belarus. It is in full communion with the Holy See.

== Education ==
Gajek was born into a Polish Roman Catholic family in Łyszkowice, central Poland, and graduated from a local school and from a gymnasium in Łowicz.

In August 1967, he joined the Congregation of Marian Fathers. Between 1967 and 1974, he studied at the Catholic University of Lublin. In the late 1960s, Gajek became engaged in activities of the exiled Belarusian clergy. He had contacts with the Belarusian cultural and religious centre in London, including bishop Ceslaus Sipovich and Robert Tamushanski. On 23 June 1974, he was ordained to the priesthood, and served for several years in a parish in Głuchołazy.

For the following two years Gajek studied at the Theology Faculty of the Catholic University of Lublin. After that he was sent to Rome, where from 1978 to 1983 he studied at the Pontificia Instituto Orientale. In November 1983, Gajek became Doctor and returned to Poland. From 1983 to 1999, he worked at the Catholic University of Lublin.

== As leader of Greek Catholics in Belarus ==
In 1994, Pope John Paul II appointed Gajek Apostolic Visitor for Greek Catholics in Belarus. In 1996, Gajek became Archimandrite and corresponding member of the Pontifical Academy of Mary. In 1997, he became adviser of the Congregation for the Oriental Churches.

Gajek is author of numerous scientific publications on Christianity in the Slavonic East.

On 30 March 2023, Pope Francis erected the apostolic administration of Belarus for the faithful of the Byzantine rite and appointed him the first apostolic administrator.

On 14 September 2026 he retired from the office of the apostolic administrator, because of age limits, and was replaced by hieromonk Liavoncij Tumouski, M.S.U.

== Gallery ==
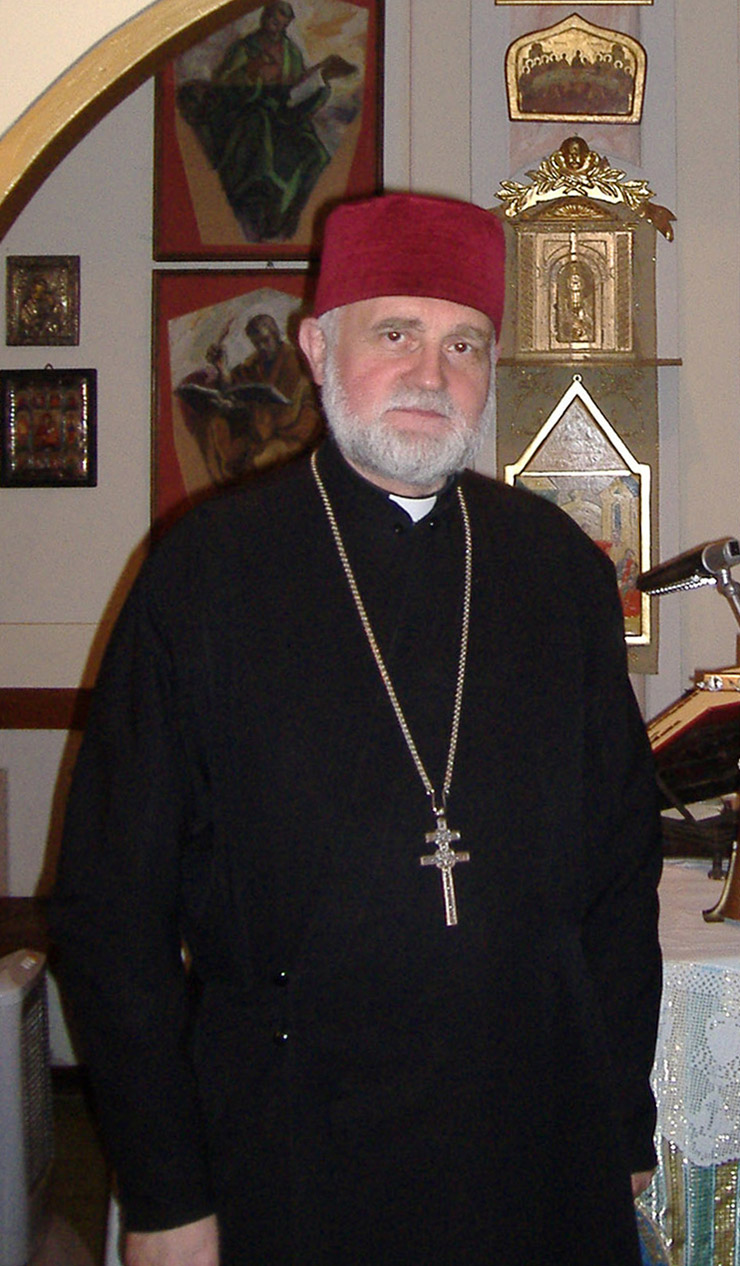
Father Gajek in 2008

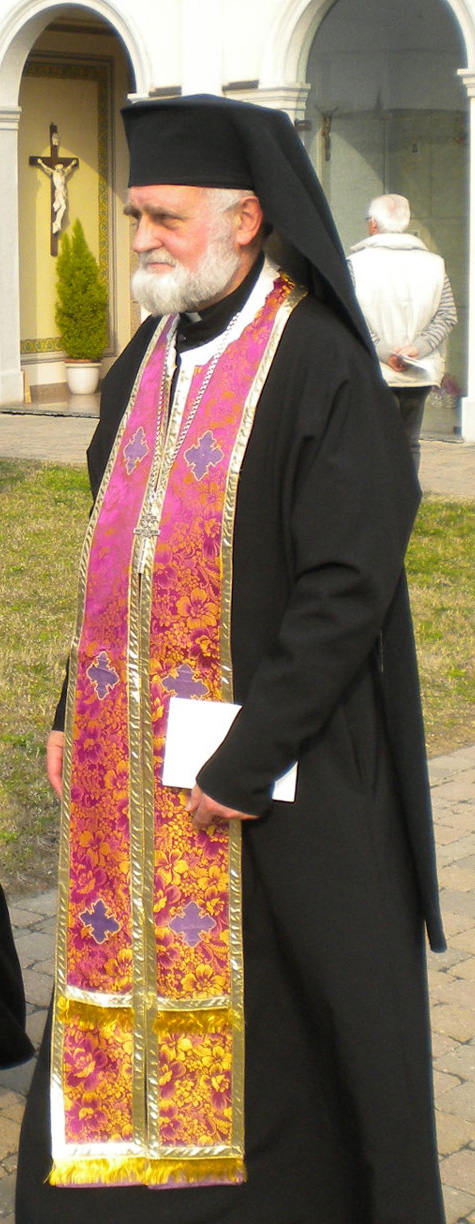
Father Gajek in 2012

== Sources ==
- Biography on the website of the St. Joseph Minsk Greek Catholic Centre
