= Bullingham =

Bullingham is a surname, and may refer to:

- Francis Bullingham (1554–ca. 1636), English politician.
- John Bullingham (died 1598), English bishop
- Nicholas Bullingham (c. 1520–1576), English bishop

== Place ==
- Bullingham, an historic village in Herefordshire
- Lower Bullingham in Herefordshire, England

== See also ==
- Herefordshire
- Hereford
