= Timeline of Polish history =

This is a timeline of Polish history, comprising important legal and territorial changes and political events in Poland and its predecessor states. To read about the background to these events, see History of Poland. See also the list of Polish monarchs and list of prime ministers of Poland.

== Prehistory ==
| Year | Date | Event |
|---|---|---|
| 800,000 BC | | First known humans on Polish lands |
| c. 500,000 BC | | Oldest Stone Tools findings in the Tunel Wielki cave suggest the remnants of Homo heidelbergensis. |
| 2400–2300 BC | | Early Bronze Age. |
| 750–700 BC | | Iron Age |

== 5th century ==
| Year | Date | Event |
|---|---|---|
| 450 | | First Slavic settlements (to 500) |

== 10th century ==
| Year | Date | Event |
|---|---|---|
| 910 | | Early stage of the Piast (Giecz-Gniezno area tribe) expansion (to 930) |
| 960 | | Beginning of Polish State |
| 965 | | Merchant Ibrahim ibn Yaqub mentions the city "Karako" (Currently Kraków) |
| 966 | April 14 | Baptism of Poland. |
| 967 | | Battle of Mieszko I with Wichmann and Wolinians |
| 970 | | Denarius becomes the currency of Poland |
| 972 | 24 June | Mieszko I defeats Odo I at the Battle of Cedynia |
| 989 | | Lesser Poland is conquered |
| 990 | | After a victory against Boleslaus II, Silesia is annexed |
| 992 | May 25 | Death of Mieszko I |
| 997 | | St. Adalbert baptises the citizens of Gyddannyzc (currently Gdańsk) |
| 1000 | March | Congress of Gniezno |

== 11th century ==
| Year | Date | Event |
|---|---|---|
| 1003 | | Bohemia and Moravia are annexed by Poland |
| 1004 | | First war with Henry II starts |
| 1007 | | Second war with Henry II starts |
| 1015 | | Third war with Henry II starts |
| 1018 | January 30 | Signing of the Peace of Bautzen (Budziszyn) with Henry II |
| 1018 | | Bolesław I's intervention in the Kievan succession crisis |
| 1025 | April 18 | Coronation of Bolesław I Chrobry |
| 1025 | June 17 | Death of Bolesław I Chrobry the Brave |
| 1025 | December 25 | Coronation of Mieszko II Lambert |
| 1031 | | Bezprym organises a coup |
| 1031 | | Mieszko II flees |
| 1031 | | Russian prince Yaroslav the Wise conquers Cherven Cities, while the Holy Roman Empire regains Lusatia |
| 1032 | | Mieszko II Lambert returns to the country, duke Bezprym dies |
| 1034 | May 10 | Death of Mieszko II Lambert |
| 1034–39 | | Pagan uprisings against Christianization |
| 1058 | November 28 | Death of Casimir I the Restorer |
| 1076 | December 26 | Coronation of Bolesław II the Bold |

== 12th century ==
| Year | Date | Event |
|---|---|---|
| 1102 | June 4 | Death of Władysław I Herman |
| 1138 | October 28 | Death of Bolesław III Wrymouth; birth of Casimir II the Just |
| 1173 | January 5 | Death of Bolesław IV the Curly |
| 1194 | May 5 | Death of Casimir II |

== 13th century ==
| Year | Date | Event |
|---|---|---|
| 1202 | March 13 | Death of Mieszko III the Old, High Duke of Poland |
| 1211 | May 16 | Death of Mieszko IV Tanglefoot |
| 1226 | March 26 | Issuance of Golden Bull of Rimini |
| 1227 | November 24 | Assassination of Leszek I the White |
| 1231 | November 3 | Death of Władysław III Spindleshanks |
| 1238 | March 19 | Death of Henry I the Bearded |
| 1241 | | First Mongol invasion of Poland |
| 1241 | April 9 | Death of Henry II the Pious |
| 1247 | August 31 | Death of Konrad I of Masovia |
| 1264 | September 8 | Issuance of Statute of Kalisz |
| 1279 | December 7 | Death of Bolesław V the Chaste |
| 1288 | September 30 | Death of Leszek II the Black |
| 1288 | | Władysław I Łokietek (the Elbow-high) inherits the lands of Poland |
| 1290 | June 23 | Death of Henryk IV Probus |
| 1295 | June 26 | Coronation of Przemysł II |
| 1295 | | Coat of arms of Poland adopted by the King |
| 1296 | February 8 | Assassination of Przemysł II |
| 1300 | August | Coronation of Wenceslaus II |

== 14th century ==
| Year | Date | Event |
|---|---|---|
| 1305 | June 21 | Death of Wenceslaus II |
| 1306 | August 4 | Assassination of Wenceslaus III |
| 1308 | | Teutonic takeover of Danzig |
| 1311–1312 | | Rebellion of wójt Albert. |
| 1320 | January 20 | Coronation of Władysław I the Elbow-high |
| 1326 | | Polish–Teutonic War (1326–1332) begins |
| 1332 | | Polish–Teutonic War concludes |
| 1333 | March 2 | Death of Władysław I the Elbow-high |
| 1333 | April 25 | Coronation of Casimir III |
| 1335 | | The first meeting of Congress of Visegrád |
| 1339 | | The second meeting of Congress of Visegrád |
| 1343 | July 8 | Signing of the Treaty of Kalisz |
| 1347–1362 | | Statutes of Casimir the Great. |
| 1364 | | Founding of Jagiellonian University |
| 1370 | November 5 | Death of Kazimierz III the Great |
| 1370 | November 17 | Coronation of Louis of Hungary |
| 1374 | September 17 | Privilege of Koszyce |
| 1382 | September 10 | Death of Louis of Hungary |
| 1382–1386 | | The first Sejm of the Kingdom of Poland. |
| 1384 | October 16 | Coronation of Jadwiga |
| 1385 | August 14 | Signing of the Union of Krewo |
| 1386 | March 4 | Coronation of Władysław II Jagiełło |
| 1399 | July 17 | Death of queen Jadwiga |

== 15th century ==
| Year | Date | Event |
|---|---|---|
| 1401 | | Union of Vilnius and Radom |
| 1409 | | Polish–Lithuanian–Teutonic War begins |
| 1410 | July 15 | Battle of Grunwald won by Władysław II Jagiełło |
| 1411 | February 1 | Signing of the First Peace of Thorn (Toruń) concludes the Polish–Lithuanian–Teutonic War |
| 1412 | November 8 | Signing of the Treaty of Lubowla |
| 1413 | October 2 | Signing of the Union of Horodło |
| 1414 | | Hunger War |
| 1422 | 17 July | Golub War begins |
| 1422 | September 27 | Signing of the Treaty of Melno concludes the Golub War |
| 1424 | | Issuance of Edict of Wieluń |
| 1431 | | Polish–Teutonic War (1431–1435) begins |
| 1432 | | Signing of the Union of Grodno |
| 1434 | June 1 | Death of Władysław II Jagiełło |
| 1434 | July 25 | Coronation of Władysław III of Varna |
| 1435 | | Polish–Teutonic War concludes |
| 1444 | November 10 | Death of Władysław III of Varna |
| 1447 | June 25 | Coronation of Kazimierz IV Jagiellon |
| 1454 | | Thirteen Years' War begins |
| 1454 | | Statutes of Nieszawa |
| 1466 | October 19 | Signing of the Second Peace of Toruń concludes the Thirteen Years' War |
| 1473 | | Almanach cracoviense ad annum 1474 published |
| 1478–1479 | | War of the Priests. |
| 1492 | June 7 | Death of Kazimierz IV Jagiellon |
| 1492 | September 23 | Coronation of Jan I Olbracht |
| 1496 | | Statutes of Piotrków |
| 1499 | | Union of Kraków and Vilnius |

== 16th century ==
| Year | Date | Event |
|---|---|---|
| 1501 | June 17 | Death of Jan I Olbracht |
| 1501 | October 3 | Union of Mielnik |
| 1501 | December 12 | Coronation of Alexander Jagiellon |
| 1505 | May 3 | Signing of act of Nihil novi |
| 1506 | August 19 | Death of Alexander Jagiellon |
| 1507 | January 24 | Coronation of Sigismund I the Old |
| 1513 | | Hortulus Animae, polonice published. |
| 1515 | July | First Congress of Vienna. |
| 1519–1521 | | Polish–Teutonic War. |
| 1525 | April 8 | Signing of the Treaty of Kraków |
| 1525 | April 10 | Prussian Homage |
| 1526 | | Annexation of Duchy of Masovia |
| 1530 | February 20 | Coronation of Sigismund II Augustus |
| 1537 | | Chicken War |
| 1543 | | De revolutionibus orbium coelestium published |
| 1548 | April 1 | Death of Zygmunt I the Old |
| 1558 | | Livonian War begins |
| 1561 | November 28 | Signing of Wilno Pact |
| 1563 | | Northern Seven Years' War begins |
| 1569 | July 1 | Signing of the Union of Lublin |
| 1570 | | Signing of Sandomierz Agreement |
| 1570 | December 13 | Signing of the Treaty of Stettin concludes the Northern Seven Years' War |
| 1572 | July 7 | Death of Zygmunt II August |
| 1573 | January 28 | Signing of the Warsaw Confederation |
| 1573 | May 11 | Election of Henry of Valois |
| 1574 | February 21 | Coronation of Henry Valois |
| 1574 | June 18 | Flight of Henry Valois |
| 1575 | December 9 | Election of Stephen Báthory |
| 1576 | 1 May | Coronation of Stephen Batory and Anna Jagiellon |
| 1579 | | Founding of Vilnius University |
| 1582 | January 15 | Signing of the Truce of Jam Zapolski concludes Commonwealth participation in the Livonian War |
| 1582 | October 15 | Adoption of the Gregorian calendar |
| 1586 | December 12 | Death of Stefan Batory |
| 1587 | August 19 | Election of Sigismund III Vasa |
| 1587 | December 27 | Coronation of Sigismund III Waza |
| 1591 | | Kosiński Uprising begins. |
| 1593 | | Kosiński Uprising ends |
| 1594 | | Nalyvaiko Uprising begins |
| 1596 | | Nalyvaiko Uprising ends |
| 1596 | | Transfer of capital from Kraków to Warsaw |
| 1596 | | Union of Brest concludes |

== 17th century ==
| Year | Date | Event |
|---|---|---|
| 1606 | 5 August | Zebrzydowski rebellion begins |
| 1609 | | Polish–Russian War (1609–1618) begins |
| 1618 | | Signing of the Truce of Deulino concludes the Polish–Russian War |
| 1620–1621 | | Polish–Ottoman War (1620–1621). |
| 1625 | | Signing of the Treaty of Kurukove |
| 1629 | | Signing of the Truce of Altmark |
| 1632 | September - November | 1632 Polish–Lithuanian royal election |
| 1632 | | Smolensk War begins |
| 1632 | April 30 | Death of Sigismund III Waza |
| 1632 | November 8 | Election of Władysław IV Vasa |
| 1633 | | Polish–Ottoman War (1633–1634) begins |
| 1633 | February 6 | Coronation of Władysław IV Vasa |
| 1634 | 14 June | Signing of the Treaty of Polyanovka concludes the Smolensk War |
| 1634 | | Polish–Ottoman War ends |
| 1635 | September 12 | Signing of the Treaty of Sztumska Wieś |
| 1648 | | Khmelnytsky Uprising begins |
| 1648 | May 20 | Death of Władysław IV Waza |
| 1648 | November 20 | Election of John II Casimir Vasa |
| 1649 | January 19 | Coronation of John II Casimir Vasa |
| 1649 | August 17 | Signing of the Treaty of Zboriv |
| 1651 | June 14 – June 24 | Kostka-Napierski uprising. |
| 1651 | September 28 | Signing of the Treaty of Bila Tserkva |
| 1654 | | Khmelnytskyi Uprising ends |
| 1654 | | Russo-Polish War begins |
| 1655 | | Deluge begins |
| 1655 | August 18 | Signing of the Union of Kėdainiai |
| 1655 | December 29 | Tyszowce Confederation formed |
| 1657 | September 9 | Signing of the Treaty of Welawa |
| 1657 | November 6 | Signing of the Treaty of Bydgoszcz |
| 1658 | September 16 | Signing of the Treaty of Hadiach |
| 1660 | May 3 | Signing of the Treaty of Oliva concludes the Deluge |
| 1665–1666 | | Lubomirski's rebellion. |
| 1667 | January 30 | Signing of the Treaty of Andrusovo concludes the Russo-Polish War. |
| 1668 | September 16 | Abdication of John II Casimir Vasa |
| 1669 | June 16 | Election of Michał Korybut Wiśniowiecki |
| 1669 | September 29 | Coronation of Michał Korybut Wiśniowiecki |
| 1672 | | Polish–Ottoman War (1672–1676) begins |
| 1672 | October 18 | Signing of the Peace of Buczacz |
| 1673 | November 10 | Death of Michael Korybut Wiśniowiecki |
| 1674 | May 19 | Election of John III Sobieski |
| 1676 | February 2 | Coronation of John III Sobieski |
| 1676 | October 17 | Signing of the Treaty of Żurawno concludes the Polish–Ottoman War |
| 1683 | September 12 | Battle of Vienna won under command of John III Sobieski |
| 1686 | May 6 | Signing of the Treaty of Perpetual Peace |
| 1696 | June 17 | Death of John III Sobieski |
| 1697 | June 27 | Election of Augustus II the Strong |
| 1697 | September 15 | Coronation of Augustus II the Strong |
| 1699 | | Signing of the Treaty of Preobrazhenskoye |
| 1699 | January 26 | Signing of the Treaty of Karlowitz concludes the Great Turkish War |

== 18th century ==
| Year | Date | Event |
|---|---|---|
| 1704 | February 16 | Warsaw Confederation formed |
| 1704 | May 20 | Sandomierz Confederation formed |
| 1704 | July 12 | Election of Stanisław Leszczyński |
| 1705 | October 4 | Coronation of Stanisław Leszczyński |
| 1706 | September 24 | Signing of the Treaty of Altranstädt |
| 1709 | July 8 | Restoration of August II the Strong |
| 1715 | | Tarnogród Confederation begins |
| 1716 | | Tarnogród Confederation ends |
| 1717 | February 1 | Silent Sejm |
| 1724 | December 7 | Tumult of Thorn |
| 1733 | | War of the Polish Succession begins |
| 1733 | February 1 | Death of August II the Strong |
| 1733 | October 5 | Election of August III the Saxon |
| 1734 | January 17 | Coronation of August III the Saxon |
| 1734 | November 5 | Dzików Confederation formed |
| 1736 | | Pacification Sejm |
| 1738 | November 18 | Treaty of Vienna concludes the War of the Polish Succession |
| 1763 | October 5 | Death of August III |
| 1764 | | Convocation Sejm |
| 1764 | September 7 | Election of Stanisław August Poniatowski |
| 1764 | November 25 | Coronation of Stanisław August Poniatowski |
| 1767 | | Repnin Sejm begins |
| 1767 | March 20 | Słuck Confederation formed |
| 1767 | June 23 | Radom Confederation formed |
| 1768 | June | Koliivshchyna. |
| 1768 | | Massacre of Uman |
| 1768 | February 29 | Signing of the Bar Confederation |
| 1772 | | First Partition of Poland |
| 1773 | October 14 | Creation of Commission of National Education |
| 1788 | | Great Sejm begins |
| 1789 | December 2 | Black Procession |
| 1790 | March 29 | Signing of Polish–Prussian alliance |
| 1791 | April 18 | Free Royal Cities Act |
| 1791 | May 3 | Adoption of Constitution of 3 May |
| 1792 | | Polish–Russian War |
| 1792 | May 14 | Signing of Targowica Confederation |
| 1792 | May 29 | Great Sejm ends |
| 1793 | | Second Partition of Poland |
| 1793 | | Grodno Sejm |
| 1794 | March 24 | Kościuszko Uprising begins |
| 1794 | March 24 | Kościuszko's proclamation |
| 1794 | May 7 | Issuance of Proclamation of Połaniec |
| 1794 | August 20 | Greater Poland Uprising begins |
| 1795 | | Third Partition of Poland |
| 1795 | November 25 | Abdication of Stanisław August Poniatowski |

== 19th century ==
| Year | Date | Event |
|---|---|---|
| 1806 | November 3 | Greater Poland Uprising begins. |
| 1806 | | The Town of Łódź became a part of the Napoleonic Duchy of Warsaw. |
| 1807 | March 19 | Beginning of the Siege of Danzig. |
| 1807 | May 24 | End the Siege of Danzig. |
| 1807 | July 9 | The second Treaty of Tilsit was signed. |
| 1807 | | Białystok was captured by the Russian Empire. |
| 1809 | October 14 | Signing of the Treaty of Schönbrunn. |
| 1815 | June 9 | Congress of Vienna concludes. |
| 1815 | October 18 | Free City of Kraków proclaimed. |
| 1815 | November 27 | Adoption of Constitution of the Kingdom of Poland. |
| 1812 | July 3 | The forces of Napoleon invaded Białystok. |
| 1813 | January | Siege of Danzig occurred. |
| 1814 | | Prussia captured Gdańsk. |
| 1815 | | The Republic of Krakow was established. |
| 1820 | January | Kraków Town Hall was demolished excluding the tower. |
| 1824 | | The Lodka settlement was founded. |
| 1825 | December 1 | Death of Alexander I of Russia. |
| 1829 | 24 May | Coronation of Nicholas I of Russia. |
| 1830 | November 29 | November Uprising begins. |
| 1831 | | Russian forces occupied Kraków. |
| 1832 | | Handelsakademie was founded. |
| 1834 | | Białystok prevented schools from teaching in the Polish language. |
| 1846 | February 19 | Kraków Uprising begins. |
| 1846 | March 4 | Kraków Uprising ended. |
| 1846 | November 16 | Free City of Kraków incorporated into the Austrian Empire. |
| 1848 | | Greater Poland Uprising. |
| 1850 | July 18 | Kraków Fire of 1850 caused the destruction of approximately one tenth of the city. |
| 1863 | January 22 | January Uprising begins. |
| 1864 | March 2 | Abolition of serfdom in Congress Poland. |
| 1873 | | The School of Fine Arts and Academy of Learning became active. |
| 1879 | | The National Museum in Kraków was founded. |
| 1881 | | Great Synagogue was constructed in Łódź. |
| 1884 | | Alexander Nevsky Cathedral was constructed. |
| 1888 | | Karl Scheibler's Chapel was constructed. |
| 1892 | | Izrael Poznański factory was constructed. |
| 1898 | | The Volunteer Fire Department was founded. |

== 20th century ==
| Year | Date | Event |
|---|---|---|
| 1908 | September 26 | Bezdany raid near Vilna on a Russian imperial train |
| 1916 | November 5 | Signing of the Act of 5th November between Germany and Austria |
| 1917 | July 9 | Oath crisis by the departing Polish Legions led by Józef Piłsudski |
| 1918 | March 3 | Signing of the Treaty of Brest-Litovsk with the Soviet Russia |
| 1918 | November 11 | Poland regains independence with the formation of the Second Polish Republic following the Armistice of 11 November 1918 |

=== The Second Polish Republic (1918–1939) ===
| Year | Date | Event |
|---|---|---|
| 1918 | November 1 | Polish–Ukrainian War begins, ends in 1919 |
| 1918 | November 11 | Polish Independence Day, Warsaw is free from German troops of the Ober Ost |
| 1918 | December 27 | Greater Poland Uprising begins, ends in 1919 |
| 1919 | January 23–30 | Polish–Czechoslovak War erupts following border disagreements |
| 1919 | January 26 | Legislative election to the Sejm |
| 1919 | February 14 | Polish–Soviet War begins |
| 1919 | February 16 | Greater Poland Uprising ends |
| 1919 | February 20 | Adoption of Small Constitution |
| 1919 | April 22 | Proclamation to the inhabitants of the former Grand Duchy of Lithuania about Międzymorze |
| 1919 | June 28 | Treaty of Versailles (Articles 87–93) and Little Treaty ratify Poland as a sovereign state internationally |
| 1919 | August 16 | First Silesian Uprising begins; Silesian Uprisings continue until 1921 |
| 1919 | August 22 | Sejny Uprising after imperial Germany turned over administration to Lithuanian delegates |
| 1920 | February 10 | Poland's Wedding to the Sea in Puck |
| 1920 | April 21 | Signing of Treaty of Warsaw |
| 1920 | July 5–16 | Spa Conference in Belgium |
| 1920 | August 12–25 | Miracle of the Vistula during the Bolshevik invasion |
| 1920 | August 19 | Second Silesian Uprising begins |
| 1920 | September 1 | Polish–Lithuanian War continues over the Vilnius and Suwałki Regions |
| 1920 | October 6 | Żeligowski's Mutiny resulting in the creation of the Republic of Central Lithuania |
| 1921 | February 19 | Signing of the Franco-Polish alliance |
| 1921 | March 3 | Polish–Romanian alliance signed in Bucharest |
| 1921 | March 17 | Adoption of March Constitution |
| 1921 | March 18 | Signing of the Peace of Riga with Lenin concludes the Polish-Soviet War |
| 1921 | March 20 | Upper Silesia plebiscite rigged |
| 1921 | May 2 | Third Silesian Uprising begins |
| 1922 | November 5–12 | Legislative election |
| 1922 | December 9 | Gabriel Narutowicz becomes President |
| 1922 | December 16 | Assassination of Gabriel Narutowicz |
| 1922 | December 22 | Stanisław Wojciechowski becomes President |
| 1923 | November 6 | 1923 Kraków riot |
| 1924 | January 11 | Władysław Grabski's monetary reform with Bank Polski SA acting as an issuing bank |
| 1925 | December 1 | Signing of the Locarno Treaties |
| 1926 | May 12–14 | May Coup |
| 1926 | June 4 | Ignacy Mościcki becomes President |
| 1928 | March 4–11 | Legislative election |
| 1928 | | Piłsudski's Nonpartisan Bloc for Cooperation with the Government election campaign |
| 1930 | November 16 | Legislative election |
| 1932 | July 25 | Signing of the Soviet–Polish Non-Aggression Pact |
| 1934 | January 26 | Signing of the German–Polish declaration of non-aggression |
| 1935 | April 23 | Adoption of April Constitution |
| 1935 | May 12 | Death of Józef Piłsudski |
| 1935 | September 15 | Legislative election |
| 1938 | April 1 | Territorial changes of Polish Voivodeships |
| 1938 | October | Annexation of Trans-Olza |
| 1938 | November 6 | Legislative election |
| 1939 | April 2 | Suicide former Prime Minister of Walery Sławek |
| 1939 | August 23 | Signing of the Molotov–Ribbentrop Pact |
| 1939 | August 25 | Signing of the Polish–British Common Defence Pact |
| 1939 | August 29 | Peking Plan begins, Polish destroyers moved to British ports |
| 1939 | August 31 | Gleiwitz incident, pretext for the invasion |

=== Occupation of Poland (1939–45) ===
| Year | Date | Event |
|---|---|---|
| 1939 | September 1 | German Invasion of Poland begins; Bombing of Wieluń |
| 1939 | September 2 | Massacre in Torzeniec village |
| 1939 | September 3 | Bloody Sunday in Bydgoszcz |
| 1939 | September 8 | German Massacre in Ciepielów of Polish POW |
| 1939 | September 13 | Bombing of Frampol, up to 90% of the town destroyed |
| 1939 | September 17 | Soviet invasion of Poland |
| 1939 | September 18 | Orzeł incident, ORP submarine escapes to the United Kingdom |
| 1939 | September 18 | The Fall of Warsaw |
| 1939 | October 1 | General Bolesław Wieniawa-Długoszowski elected President |
| 1939 | October 6 | Poland completely occupied |
| 1939 | November 6 | Sonderaktion Krakau operation against university professors |
| 1940 | March 5 | Authorization of Katyń massacre |
| 1940 | May 16 | Authorization of German AB-Aktion in Poland |
| 1941 | June 30 – July 29 | Lviv pogroms |
| 1941 | July 2 | Massacre of Lwów professors |
| 1941 | July 10 | Jedwabne pogrom |
| 1941 | August 17 | Signing of the Sikorski–Mayski agreement in London |
| 1941 | October 12 | Stanisławów Ghetto Bloody Sunday massacre |
| 1942 | March 17 | Bełżec extermination camp begins secretive Operation Reinhard |
| 1942 | May 16 | Sobibór extermination camp starts mass gassing operations |
| 1942 | July 22 | Treblinka extermination camp becomes ready for the Grossaktion Warsaw deportations |
| 1943 | March 26 | Operation Arsenal, first major operation by the Szare Szeregi |
| 1943 | April 19 | Warsaw Ghetto Uprising begins |
| 1943 | May 16 | Warsaw Ghetto Uprising ends |
| 1943 | July 4 | Death of Polish military leader Władysław Sikorski |
| 1943 | July 11 | Bloody Sunday, the peak of Massacres of Poles in Volhynia and Eastern Galicia |
| 1943 | July 11–12 | Zagaje massacre |
| 1943 | December 1 | Tehran Conference concludes in the Soviet embassy in Tehran |
| 1944 | January 29 | Koniuchy massacre by Soviet partisans |
| 1944 | February 28 | Huta Pieniacka massacre by Ukrainian Grenadier Division of the Waffen-SS |
| 1944 | June 20 | Glinciszki massacre by Lithuanian Auxiliary Police |
| 1944 | June 23 | Dubingiai massacre by Home Army |
| 1944 | July 22 | Proclamation of the PKWN Manifesto by Soviet-backed Polish Committee of National Liberation |
| 1944 | July 25 | Operation Most III begins on the German V-2 rocket |
| 1944 | August | Wola massacre in the opening phase of the Warsaw Uprising |
| 1944 | August 1 | Warsaw Uprising begins |
| 1944 | October 2 | Warsaw Uprising ends |
| 1945 | January 26 | Przyszowice massacre |
| 1945 | February 11 | Yalta Conference concludes |
| 1945 | March | Pawłokoma massacre |
| 1945 | March 17 | Poland's Wedding to the Sea in Mrzeżyno |
| 1945 | March 18 | Poland's Wedding to the Sea in Kołobrzeg |

=== Communist takeover, Polish People's Republic ===
| Year | Date | Event |
|---|---|---|
| 1945 | May 8 | End of World War II in Europe |
| 1945 | June 18–21 | Trial of the Sixteen Polish Underground leaders in Moscow |
| 1945 | July 10–25 | Augustów roundup of anti-Communist partisans |
| 1945 | August 2 | Potsdam Conference concludes between the Soviet Union, the United Kingdom, and the United States |
| 1945 | August 11 | Kraków pogrom with one dead victim |
| 1946 | January 20 | By order of the Minister of National Defence, military district courts (WSR) were established with seats in voivodeship capitals. |
| 1946 | February 21 | The Voluntary Reserves of the Citizens' Militia were established |
| 1946 | March 28 | The State Security Commission was established, whose purpose was to coordinate activities against the opposition and the independence underground in the period preceding the "people's referendum" and the elections to the Legislative Sejm |
| 1946 | June 30 | A People's referendum was held, preceded by a nationwide campaign to combat the political opposition - primarily the PSL and the independence underground. A special Soviet group led by Colonel Aron Palkin participated in the campaign to falsify the referendum results |
| 1946 | July 4 | Kielce pogrom |
| 1946 | July 5 | The decree of the State National Council came into force, proclaiming the establishment of the Main Office for the Control of the Press, Publications and Entertainment |
| 1946 | September 20-23 | The last session of the KRN was held. During the session, the date of elections to the Legislative Sejm was set for January 19, 1947 and the main assumptions of the country's economic reconstruction plan - the three-year plan - were adopted. |
| 1946 | September 26 | The decision was announced to create an electoral bloc of PPR, PPS, SL, and SD, propaganda called the Bloc of Democratic Parties. |
| 1947 | January 19 | Legislative election rigged, 100,000 ORMO men deployed to intimidate voters |
| 1947 | February 19 | Adoption of Small Constitution of 1947 |
| 1947 | April 28 | Operation Vistula begins |
| 1947 | November 24 | Auschwitz trial begins in Kraków |
| 1948 | February 25 | The General Youth Organization "Service to Poland" was established. |
| 1948 | March 10 | During the joint meeting of the Central Committee of the PPR and the Central Electoral Commission of the PPS, the formal decision was made to unite the parties. |
| 1948 | April 25 | The Higher Marxist School was established at the Central Committee of the PZPR. |
| 1949 | January 1 | State Agricultural Farms were established (since 1976 operating under the name of State Agricultural Enterprises). |
| 1949 | June 1-5 | The 2nd Trade Union Congress took place |
| 1949 | November 25-27 | The Congress of the Unity of the People's Movement took place, which resulted in the merger of PSL and SL into the United People's Party. The chairman of the Supreme Council was Józef Niećko, and the chairman of the Supreme Executive Committee was Władysław Kowalski. |
| 1950 | January 23 | Communists establish administration over the church charity organization "Caritas" |
| 1950 | July 21 | The law on the 6-year plan for economic development and building the foundations of socialism for the years 1950-1955 was passed |
| 1950 | March 10 | A Special Bureau was established within the MPB, entrusted with the task of combating provocations in the workers' movement. |
| 1950 | March 20 | A new administrative organization was established. Thus, the provincial offices, county offices, and the positions of governors, starosts, and city presidents were liquidated and were replaced with voivodeship, powiat and city National Councils. The act transformed them into local state administration bodies, which was another stage in the centralization of power. |
| 1950 | April 19 | The Office for Religious Affairs was established, and soon its local agencies were established at the provincial, city and district national councils. |
| 1950 | June 28 | A new administrative division of the country was formed, and the number of voivodeships increased to seventeen. This division into voivodeships remained until the administrative reform carried out in 1975 |
| 1950 | July 6 | Treaty of Zgorzelec signed in the border with East Germany |
| 1950 | October 14 | The verdict in the trial of the 4th Main Board of WiN has been announced: Leader Łukasz Cieplinski and his six associates were sentenced to death, three people to long-term imprisonment |
| 1950 | October 16 | The Institute for Training of Scientific Cadres at the Central Committee of the PZPR began its operations. |
| 1951 | February 15 | The Treaty on the Exchange of Territories was signed in Moscow between the Polish and Soviet governments |
| 1951 | July 31 | Trial of the Generals who served in the anti-Nazi resistance during World War II |
| 1951 | August 2 | Władysław Gomułka is arrested |
| 1951 | September 9 | Stefan Matryka, the narrator of the propaganda radio program Fala-49, was shot dead |
| 1951 | November 6 | In Żerań, in the northern part of Warsaw's Praga district, the Fabryka Samochodów Osobowych, which had been under construction since 1949, was launched |
| 1952 | April 16 | August Emil Fieldorf is sentenced to death |
| 1952 | July 22 | Adoption of Constitution of the People's Republic of Poland by the Legislative Sejm |
| 1952 | August 30 | The All-Polish Committee National Front was established under the chairmanship of Boleslaw Bierut. |
| 1952 | October 26 | First Legislative election by the one-party rule |
| 1953 | February 9 | The Council of State issued a decree on the appointment of church clergy, in which the communists gave themselves the right to directly interfere in the personnel policy of the Church |
| 1953 | March 14 | Michał Rola-Żymierski is arrested in a political struggle |
| 1953 | June 3 | One of the changes in the management of the Soviet sphere of influence was the decision - formally taken by the Commission for National Defense of the Polish People's Republic - to send some of the Red Army generals who had been recommended to the Polish People's Army in previous years to the USSR. |
| 1953 | December 5 | A clear signal of the "thaw" was the recall of Dymitr Woźnienski and Antoni Skulbaszewski from the Polish People's Republic to the USSR. Both were sentenced to 10 years in prison in the USSR for violating the rule of law. |
| 1953 | December 17 | Józef Światło, deputy director of Department X of the MBP, fled to West Berlin. The fugitive surrendered to American intelligence |
| 1954 | March 10-17 | During the Second Congress of the Polish United Workers' Party, where Nikita Khrushchev was a special guest, a decision was made to imitate the changes introduced in the USSR. |
| 1954 | March 18 | The State Council implemented the decisions of the 2nd Congress of the Polish United Workers' Party, dismissing Bolesław Bierut from the position of Prime Minister and entrusting this position to Józef Cyrankiewicz. At the same time, Władysław Dworakowski ceased to be Deputy Prime Minister, and Hilary Minc was dismissed from the position of Chairman of the State Economic Planning Commission to be replaced by Eugeniusz Szyr. |
| 1954 | August 3 | The operation codenamed X-2 began, the aim of which was to displace about 1,400 nuns from Lower and Upper Silesia. They were moved to 8 labour camps located in convent buildings in the Krakow and Poznan regions. |
| 1954 | September 25 | An administrative reform was carried out, in which the four-level structure was replaced by a three-level division. The changes consisted of the liquidation of communes, while the administrative boundaries of the gromadas were simultaneously extended. |
| 1954 | November 24-25 | A secret meeting of the Political Bureau of the Central Committee of the Polish United Workers' Party was held. Cliques began to emerge within the Polish United Workers' Party leadership, representing different possibilities of getting out of the political and economic crisis that was plaguing the Polish People's Republic. |
| 1954 | December 7 | The MBP was dissolved, and in its place the Committee for Public Security and the Ministry of Internal Affairs were established. |
| 1955 | April 30 | The broadcast of TVP's regular programme has begun. |
| 1955 | May 14 | Signing of the Warsaw Pact |
| 1956 | February 19 | The first public criticism of Stalin's actions in the Polish People's Republic. "Trybuna Ludu" published a statement signed by the central committees of the Polish United Workers' Party, the Communist Party of Poland. |
| 1956 | March 12 | Death of Bolesław Bierut |
| 1956 | March 20 | The 6th Plenum of the Central Committee of the Polish United Workers' Party was held, during which the memory of Bierut was honored |
| 1956 | June 28 | Poznań 1956 protests |
| 1956 | October 21 | Polish October, return of Władysław Gomułka |
| 1957 | January 20 | Legislative election |
| 1957 | August 12-14 | The tram drivers in Łódź went on strike. It was one of 11 strikes in Łódź and one of many taking place in the country at that time. |
| 1959 | October 18 | Price increase of average 25% for meat, animal fats and meat products was introduced |
| 1959 | October 28 | Jerzy Morawski, a member of the reformist Puławians group in the Polish United Workers' Party, resigned from his membership in the Political Bureau and the Secretariat of the Central Committee. |
| 1959 | December 3-5 | The congress of delegates of the Polish Writers' Union was in session. Jarosław Iwaszkiewicz was elected the new president |
| 1960 | May 30 | Stormy protests took place in Zielona Góra in response to the authorities' attempt to close down the Catholic House inhabited by priests. |
| 1961 | April 16 | Legislative election |
| 1964 | June 15-20 | The 4th Congress of the Polish United Workers' Party took place, which strengthened the so-called small stabilization. Gomułka outlined economic plans for the coming years, assuming a 50% increase in industrial production. In the five-year period of 1966-1970, 1.5 million new jobs were to be created, and the national income was to increase by 30%. Gomułka, who was formally re-elected to the position of the First Secretary of the Central Committee of the Polish United Workers' Party, sharply criticized the leaders of the Chinese communists for the split. |
| 1964 | August 13 | Edward Ochoba was appointed Chairman of the State Council after Aleksander Zawadzki's death on August 7. |
| 1964 | November 9 | The Provincial Court for the Capital City of Warsaw sentenced the famous writer Melchior Wankowicz to three years in prison, which was changed to one and a half years under an amnesty. |
| 1965 | February 2 | The court sentenced to death Stanisław Wawrzecki, director of the Municipal Meat Trading Company - the main defendant in the so-called meat affair. The sentence was carried out on April 9, it was the only one carried out after 1956 in the Polish People's Republic for a crime of an economic nature. |
| 1965 | May 30 | Legislative election |
| 1965 | July 20 | Gen. Tadeusz Pietrzak became the new commander-in-chief of the Citizens' Militia. |
| 1965 | November 18 | Letter of Reconciliation of the Polish Bishops to the German Bishops |
| 1965 | December 3 | In Zabrze, during the Miner's Day celebrations, Gomułka summed up the second five-year plan (1961-1965) |
| 1968 | March | Political crisis |
| 1968 | August 20 | End of Prague Spring with the invasion of Czechoslovakia |
| 1970 | December 7 | Signing of Treaty of Warsaw; Warschauer Kniefall |
| 1970 | December 14 | 1970 protests begin |
| 1974 | February 4 | The 1st National Conference of the PZPR |
| 1978 | October 16 | Election of Pope John Paul II |
| 1980 | | Gdańsk Agreement |
| 1980 | March 14 | LOT Polish Airlines Flight 007 |
| 1980 | August 17 | 21 demands of MKS |
| 1981 | May 28 | Death of Primate Poland Stefan Wyszyński |
| 1981 | December 13 | Martial law begins |
| 1983 | | Solidarity leader Lech Wałęsa receives the Nobel Peace Prize. |
| 1983 | July 22 | Martial law ends |
| 1984 | | Father Jerzy Popiełuszko murdered by Polish secret police. |
| 1989 | April 4 | Signing of the Round Table Agreement |
| 1989 | April 7 | April Novelization |
| 1989 | June 4 | Parliamentary election |
| 1989 | July 19 | Lech Wałęsa becomes President |
| 1989 | August 24 | Tadeusz Mazowiecki becomes first non-communist prime minister in the Eastern Bloc |
| 1989 | August-December | Prison riots |
| December 31 | The People's Republic of Poland becomes the Republic of Poland | |

=== Democratic Republic of Poland ===
| Year | Date | Event |
|---|---|---|
| 1990 | May 27 | Local elections |
| 1990 | November 14 | Signing of German–Polish Border Treaty |
| 1990 | November 25 | Presidential election |
| 1990 | December 22 | Lech Wałęsa becomes President |
| 1991 | June 27 | Mława riot after Romani youth kills pedestrian in a hit-and-run |
| 1991 | July 1 | Dissolution of Warsaw Pact |
| 1991 | October 27 | Parliamentary election |
| 1992 | October 17 | Adoption of Small Constitution |
| 1992 | December 21 | Signing of Central European Free Trade Agreement |
| 1993 | September 14 | Lufthansa Flight 2904 |
| 1993 | September 19 | Parliamentary election |
| 1994 | May 2 | Poland bus disaster of 1994 killed 32 people. |
| 1994 | June 19 | Local elections |
| 1995 | November | Presidential election |
| 1995 | December 23 | Aleksander Kwaśniewski becomes President |
| 1997 | April 2 | Adoption of Constitution |
| 1997 | September 21 | Parliamentary election |
| 1998 | October 11 | Local elections |
| 1999 | January 1 | 16 new voivodeships created in Polish local government reforms |
| 1999 | March 12 | Poland joins NATO |
| 2000 | October 8 | Presidential election |

== 21st century ==
| Year | Date | Event |
|---|---|---|
| 2001 | September 23 | Parliamentary election |
| 2002 | | Census |
| 2002 | October 27 | Local elections |
| 2003 | April 16 | Signing of the Treaty of Accession |
| 2003 | June | European Union membership referendum |
| 2004 | 1 May | Poland joins in the European Union |
| 2004 | June 13 | European Parliament election |
| 2005 | April 2 | Death of Pope John Paul II |
| 2005 | September 25 | Parliamentary election |
| 2005 | October | Presidential election |
| 2005 | December 23 | Lech Kaczyński becomes President |
| 2006 | January 28 | Katowice Trade Hall roof collapse |
| 2006 | November | Local elections |
| 2007 | October 21 | Parliamentary election |
| 2010 | April 10 | Polish Air Force Tu-154 crash killing Polish President Lech Kaczyński |
| 2010 | July 4 | Bronisław Komorowski elected president. |
| 2011 | August 5 | Suicide of Andrzej Lepper |
| 2011 | October 9 | Parliamentary election |
| 2012 | March 3 | A train crash near Szczekociny, Poland, kills 16 people. |
| 2014 | April 27 | Canonization of Pope John Paul II |
| 2014 | May 25 | Death of Wojciech Jaruzelski |
| 2015 | May | Presidential election |
| 2015 | August 6 | Andrzej Duda becomes President |
| 2020 | October 22 | Women's strike protests. Part of the Polish constitutional crisis. |
| 2023 | October 15 | Parliamentary election |

== See also ==
- Timeline of Białystok
- Timeline of Gdańsk
- Timeline of Kraków
- Timeline of Łódź
- Timeline of Poznań
- Timeline of Szczecin
- Timeline of Warsaw
- Timeline of Wrocław
- Category:Timelines of cities in Poland (in Polish)
- Periodization of Polish history
