= Prehistory and protohistory of Poland =

Poland before the 10th century AD

The prehistory and protohistory of Poland can be traced from the first appearance of Homo species on the territory of modern-day Poland, to the establishment of the Polish state in the 10th century AD, a span of roughly 500,000 years.

The area of present-day Poland went through the stages of socio-technical development known as the Stone, Bronze and Iron Ages after experiencing the climatic shifts of the glacial periods. The best known archaeological discovery from the prehistoric period is the Lusatian-culture Biskupin fortified settlement. As ancient civilizations began to appear in southern and western Europe, the cultures of the area of present-day Poland were influenced by them to various degrees.

Among the peoples that inhabited various parts of Poland up to the Iron Age stage of development were Scythian, Celtic, Germanic, Sarmatian, Roman, Avar, Vlach and Baltic tribes. In the Early Middle Ages, the area came to be dominated by West Slavic tribes and finally became home to a number of Lechitic Polish tribes that formed small states in the region beginning in the 8th century.

== Historiography ==
As with other early periods areas of human history, knowledge of these times is limited, since few written ancient and medieval sources are available; research therefore relies primarily on archaeology. Written language came to the Poles only after 966 AD, when the ruler of the Polish lands, Duke Mieszko I, converted to Christianity and educated foreign clerics arrived.

== Stone Age ==
Poland's Stone Age is divided into the Paleolithic, Mesolithic and Neolithic eras.

The Paleolithic era extended from c. 500,000 BC to 8,000 BC and is subdivided into four periods: the Lower Paleolithic, c. 500,000 to 350,000 BC; the Middle Paleolithic, c. 350,000 to 40,000 BC; the Upper Paleolithic, c. 40,000 to 10,000 BC; and the Final Paleolithic, c. 10,000 to 8000 BC.

The Mesolithic era lasted from c. 8000 to 5500 BC and the Neolithic from c. 5500 to 2300 BC.

The Neolithic is subdivided into the Neolithic proper, c. 5500 – 2900 BC, and the Copper Age, c. 2900 – 2300 BC.

Poland's Stone Age lasted approximately 500,000 years and saw the appearance of three distinct Homo species: Homo erectus, Homo neanderthalensis and Homo sapiens (humans). The Stone Age cultures ranged from early human groups with primitive tools to advanced agricultural and stratified societies that used sophisticated stone tools, built fortified settlements and developed copper metallurgy.

As elsewhere in Central Europe, the Paleolithic, Mesolithic and Neolithic stages of Poland's Stone Age were each characterized by refinements in stone-tool-making techniques. Paleolithic human activities (whose earliest sites are 500,000 years old) were intermittent because of recurring glaciations. A general climate warming and a resulting increase in ecologic diversity were characteristic of the Mesolithic era (9000–8000 BC).

The Neolithic era ushered in the first settled agricultural communities, whose founders had migrated from the Danube River area beginning about 5500 BC. Later, the native post-Mesolithic populations would also adopt and further develop the agricultural way of life (between 4400 and about 2000 BC).

== Bronze and Iron Ages ==
Poland's Bronze Age comprised Period I, c. 2300–1600 BC; Period II, c. 1600–1350 BC; Period III, c. 1350–1100 BC; Period IV, c. 1100–900 BC; and Period V, c. 900–700 BC. The Early Iron Age included Hallstatt Period C, c. 700–600 BC, and Hallstatt Period D, c. 600–450 BC.

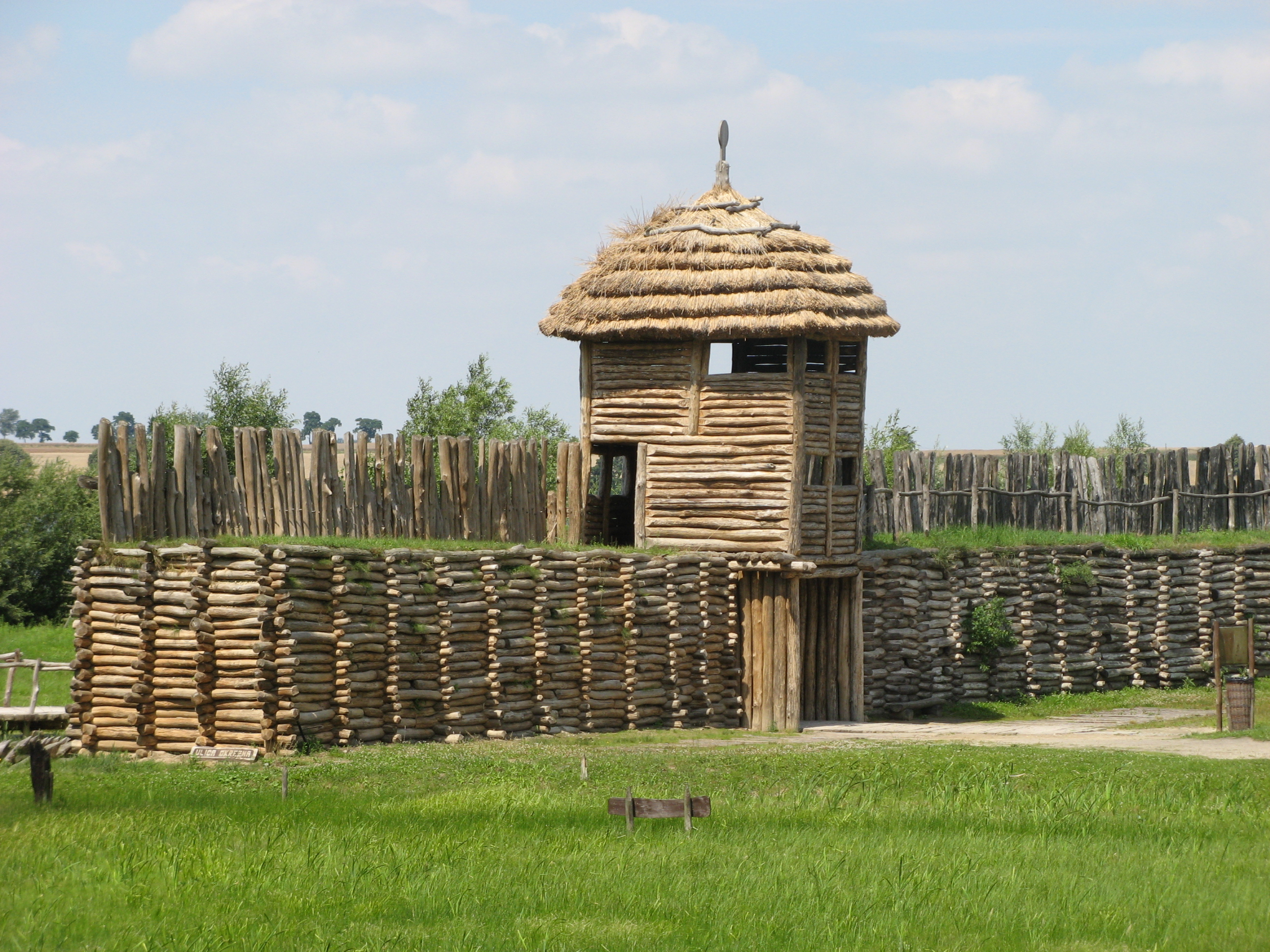
Reconstructed Biskupin

Poland's Bronze- and Iron-Age cultures are known mainly from archaeological research. Poland's Early Bronze Age cultures began around 2300-2400 BC, whereas the Iron Age commenced c. 700-750 BC. By the beginning of the Common Era, the Iron Age archaeological cultures described in the main article no longer existed. Given the absence of written records, the ethnicities and linguistic affiliations of the groups living in Central and Eastern Europe at that time are speculative; there is considerable disagreement about their identities. In Poland, the Lusatian culture, which spanned the Bronze and Iron Ages, became particularly prominent. The most famous archaeological discovery from that period is the Biskupin fortified settlement (gród) that represented early-Iron-Age Lusatian culture.

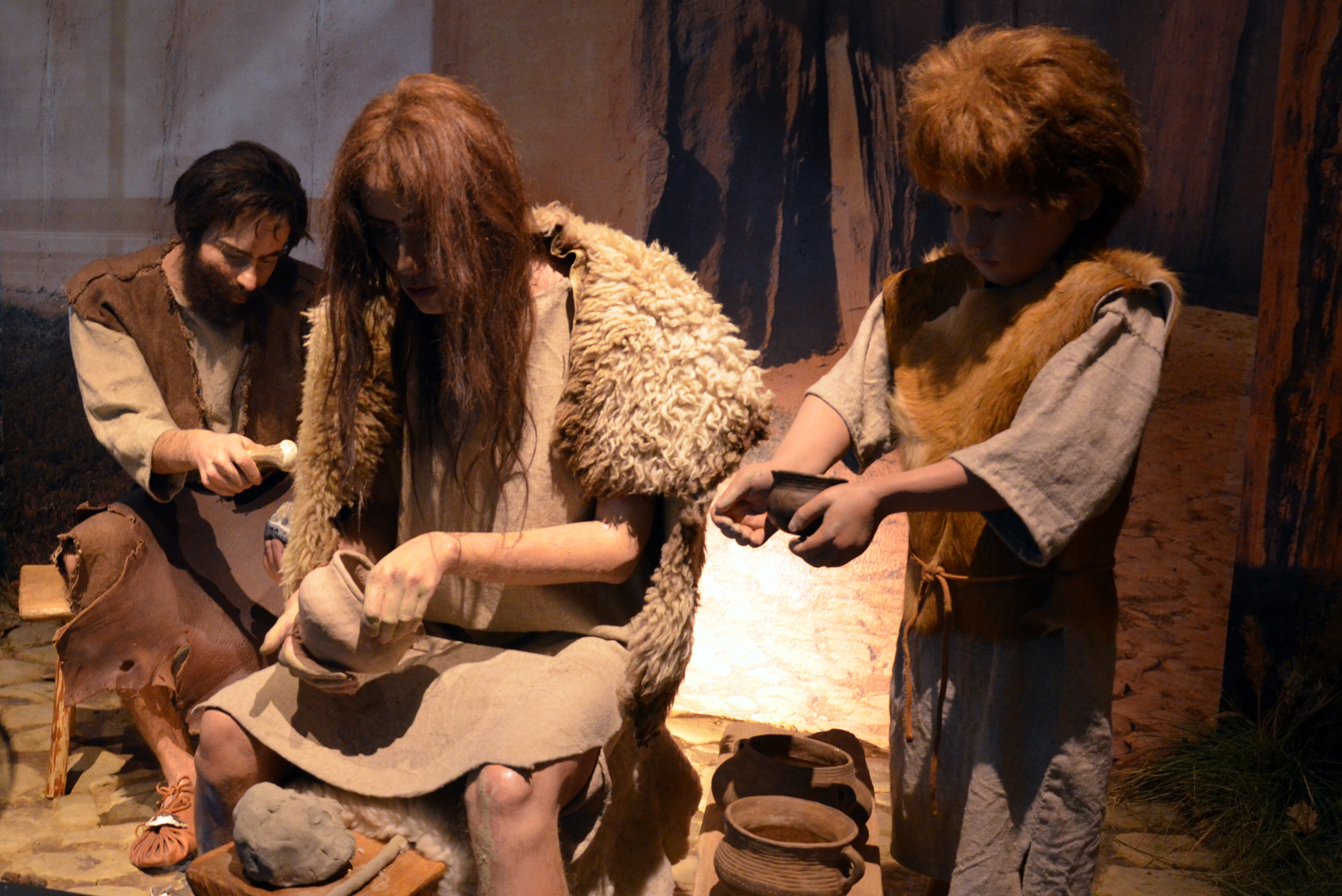
Reconstruction of the Mierzanowice culture people from Poland, circa 2100 to 1650 BC

Bronze objects were brought to Poland around 2300 BC from the Carpathian Basin. The native Early Bronze Age that followed was dominated by the innovative Unetice culture in western Poland and the conservative Mierzanowice culture in eastern Poland. These were replaced in their respective territories for the duration of the subsequent Older Bronze Period by the (pre-Lusatian) Tumulus culture and the Trzciniec culture.

Characteristic of the remaining bronze periods were the Urnfield cultures, in which skeletal burials were replaced by cremation throughout much of Europe. In Poland, the Lusatian culture settlements dominated the landscape for nearly a thousand years, continuing into the Early Iron Age. A series of Scythian invasions beginning in the 6th century BC, precipitated their demise. The Hallstatt Period D was a time of expansion for the Pomeranian culture, while the Western Baltic Kurgan culture dominated Poland's Masuria-Warmia region.

== Antiquity ==
The period of the La Tène culture is subdivided into La Tène A, c. 450–400 BC; La Tène B, c. 400–250 BC; La Tène C, c. 250–150 BC; and La Tène D, c. 150–0 BC. The period from 200 to 0 BC may also be considered a younger pre-Roman period. It was followed by a period of Roman influence whose early stage lasted from c. 0 to 150 AD and its later stage from c. 150 to 375 AD. The period from 375 to 500 AD constitutes the (pre-Slavic) Migration Period.

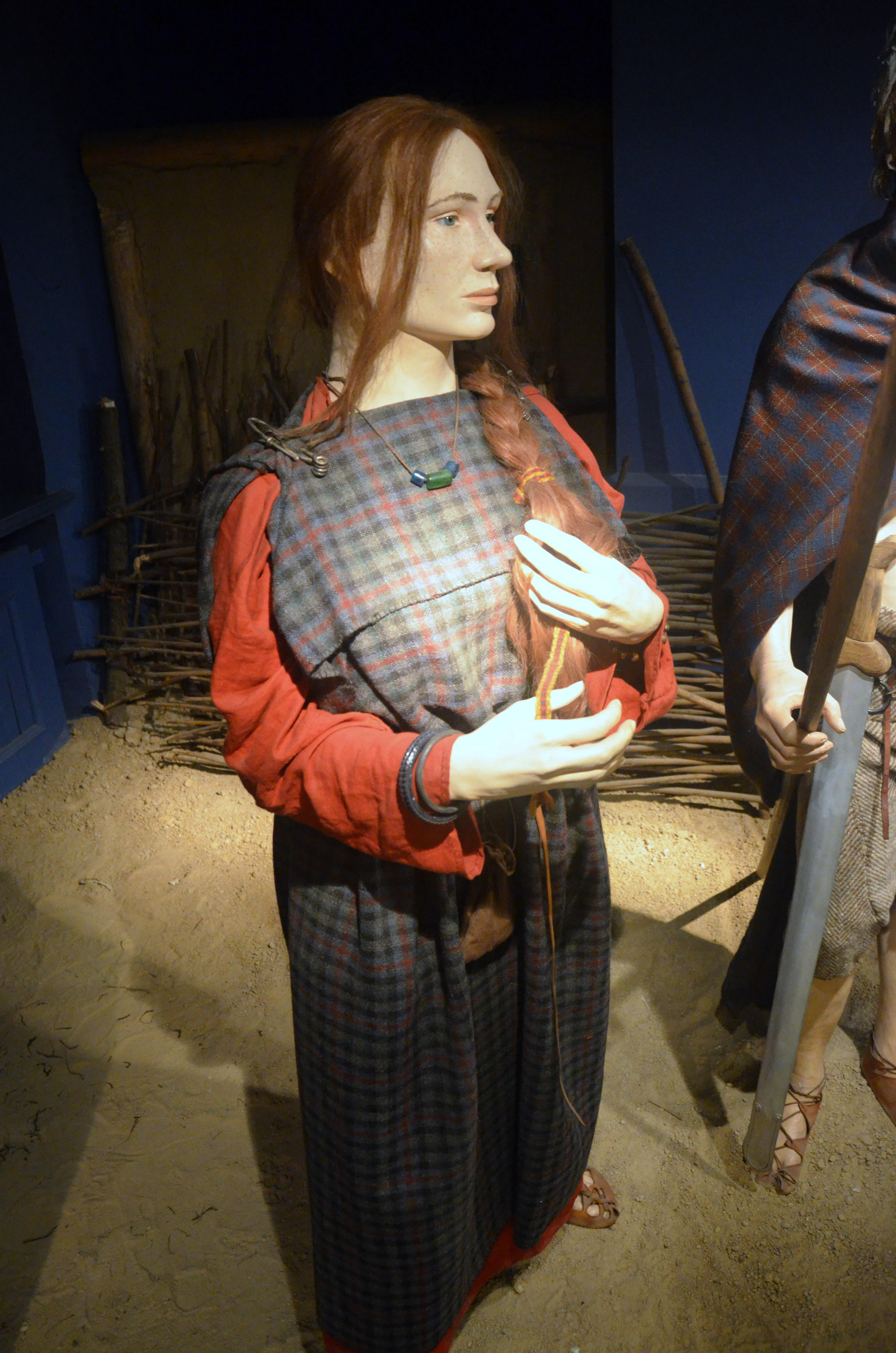
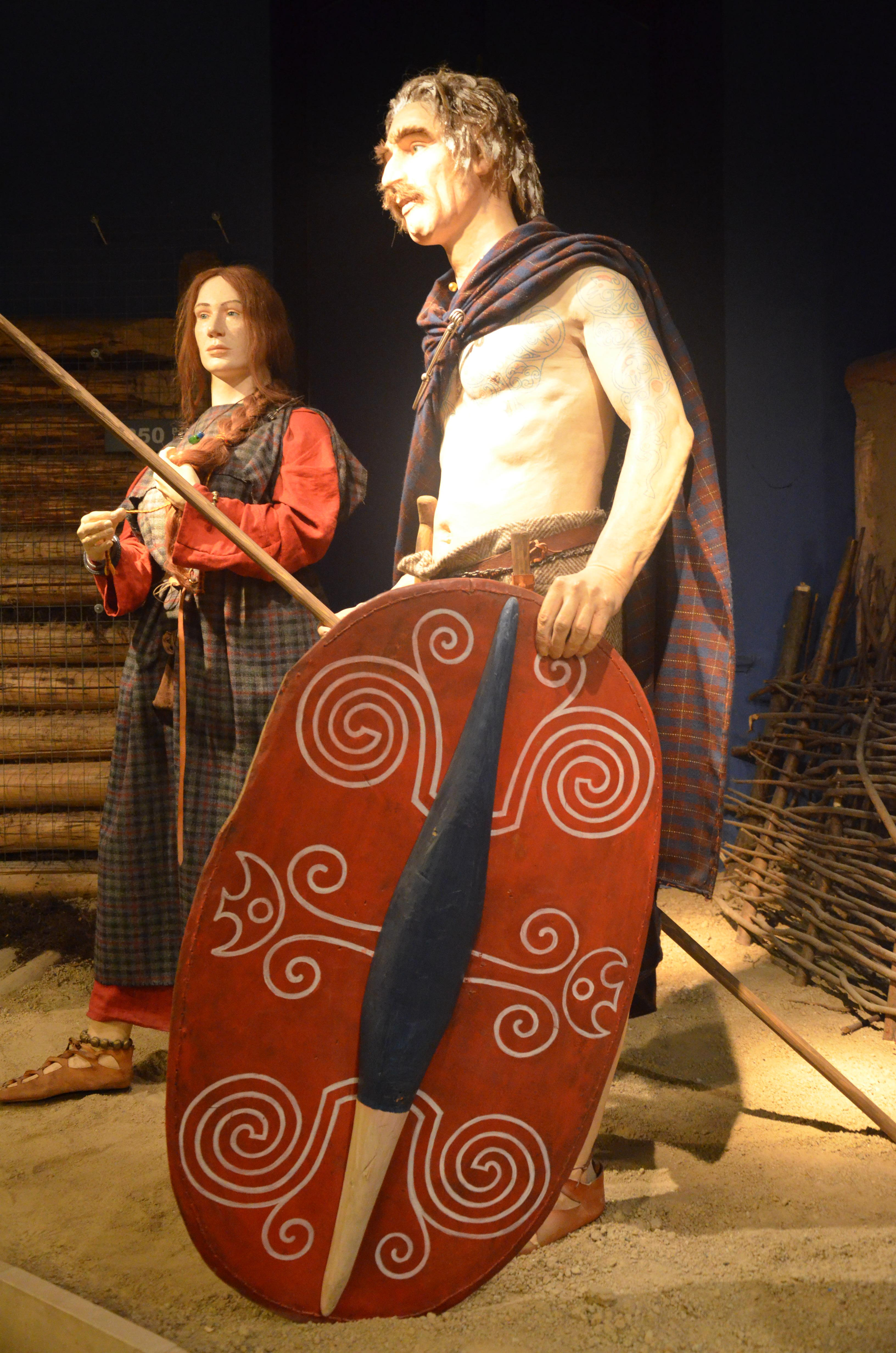
Celtic costumes in Przeworsk culture, third century BC, La Tène period, Archaeological Museum of Kraków

Peoples belonging to numerous archaeological cultures identified with Celtic, Germanic, Baltic, and in some regions Slavic tribes inhabited parts of Poland during the era of classical antiquity, from about 400 BC to 450-500 AD. Other groups, difficult to identify, were most likely also present, as the ethnic composition of archaeological cultures is often poorly recognized. Short of using a written language to any appreciable degree, many of them developed a relatively advanced material culture and social organization, as evidenced by the archaeological record, for example by richly furnished, dynastic "princely" graves. Characteristic of this period were high rates of migration, often involving large groups of people.

Celtic peoples established settlements beginning in the early 4th century BC, mostly in southern Poland, the outer limit of their expansion, as representatives of the La Tène culture. With their developed economy and crafts, they exerted a lasting cultural influence disproportionate to their small numbers in the region.

Germanic peoples lived in what is now Poland for several centuries, during which many of their tribes also migrated southward and eastward (see Wielbark culture). With the expansion of the Roman Empire, the Germanic tribes came under Roman cultural influence. Some written remarks by Roman authors that are relevant to developments on Polish lands have been preserved; they provide additional insights in conjunction with the archaeological record. In the end, as the Roman Empire was nearing its collapse and the nomadic peoples invading from the east destroyed, damaged or destabilized the various Germanic cultures and societies, the Germanic peoples left Eastern and Central Europe for the safer and wealthier southern and western parts of the European continent. According to Tacitus and Ptolemy, the Goths left the lower Vistula region in the mid-2nd century AD.

The northeast corner of what is now Poland remained populated by Baltic tribes. They were at the outer limits of any substantial cultural influence from the Roman Empire.

Slavic peoples may have lived in the southern and southeastern regions, some perhaps associated with the ancient Przeworsk and Zarubintsy cultures of the 3rd century BC (with the Przeworsk culture being considered likely of Slavic or of mixed Slavic and Germanic origin). It has been suggested that the early Slavic peoples and languages may have originated in the region of Polesia, which includes the area around the Belarus–Ukraine border, parts of Western Russia, and parts of far Eastern Poland. More of Poland would be settled by Slavic tribes in later periods, in the early centuries of the common era.

== See also ==
- Tunel Wielki
- Periodization of Polish history
