= Timeline of Białystok =

This is a sub-article to History of Białystok

The following is a timeline of the history of the city of Białystok, Poland.

== Prior to 19th century ==
- 1320 – Settlement founded in Lithuania.
- 1569 – part of the Lesser Poland Province of the Crown of the Kingdom of Poland
- 1692 – Białystok granted city rights by Polish King John III Sobieski
- 1697 – Branicki Palace built.
- 1745 – the first military technical school in Poland founded in Białystok
- 1748 – one of the oldest theaters in Poland, the Komedialnia, founded
- 1749 – King Augustus III of Poland extended the city limits
- 1753 – Center of the city burns down
- 1756 – Jan Klemens Branicki, owner of Białystok, divorces his third wife
- 1763–1768 – Municipal hospital founded by Jan Klemens Branicki.
- 13 July 1769 – Battle of Białystok (1769), part of the War of the Bar Confederation
- 1770 – midwifery school founded under the auspices of Izabella Poniatowska
- 9 October 1771 – Jan Klemens Branicki dies
- 1776 – Polish 5th Regiment of Fusiliers of Crown Artillery stationed in Białystok.
- 1789 – the epidemic of smallpox, the 22 children died
- 1795 – City annexed by Prussia in the Third Partition of Poland and made the administrative seat of the Białystok Department
- 26 January 1796 – Prussian administration takes over the town, but it remains formally owned by Izabella Poniatowska-Branicka

== 19th century ==
- 1805 – Institute of Obstetrics established based on the midwifery school
- 1807 – Town becomes part of Russia, per Peace of Tilsit; and capital of the Belostok Oblast.
- 14 February 1808 – Izabella Poniatowska-Branicka dies
- 3 July 1812 – Napoleon's army enters the city,
- 13 July 1812 – Declaration of the inhabitants of communication with the Commonwealth,
- 4 August 1812 – Russian army enters the city
- 8 August 1812 – giving a new coat of the city by Tsar Alexander I
- 13 December 1830 – announcement of martial law by the Russian authorities in connection with the outbreak of the November Uprising,
- 1 February 1831 – setting up headquarters in the Russian army commander, Field Marshal Hans Karl von Diebitsch, whose task was to suppress the November Uprising
- 1834 – a ban on teaching in schools in the Polish language
- 1842 – City becomes administratively part of the Grodno Governorate.
- 1845 – Woollen mill built.
- 1857 – Population: 13,787.
- 15 December 1859 – Ludwik Zamenhof, the creator of the international language Esperanto, was born
- 13 June 1860 – the beginning of a patriotic demonstration under the banner of national unity and fight against colonization,
- 1861
  - 16 March: Prayers were held by local Poles and Jews in memory of Polish protesters massacred by the Russians in Warsaw a few weeks earlier.
  - 3 May: The Russians arrested several Polish students during the celebration of the Polish 3 May Constitution Day.
  - 9 June: Andrzej Artur Zamoyski, representative of the Whites, arrives in the city
- 1862 – Opening of the Saint Petersburg–Warsaw Railway through the city
- 24 April 1863 – the beginning of the Polish January Uprising in the Białystok area
- 15 February 1864 – Battle of the January Uprising was fought near Białystok.
- 1877 – expanding the city limits: integrated railway station, the village of Piaski and Las Zwierzyniecki
- 1886 – the railway line Bialystok – Vawkavysk – Baranovichi
- 1889 – Population: 56,629.
- 1891 – Launch of the first telephone exchange
- 1895 – launch of three lines of horse tram
- 1897 – Population: 63,927.
- 1898 – establishment of the Volunteer Fire Department

== 20th century ==
=== 1901–1939 ===
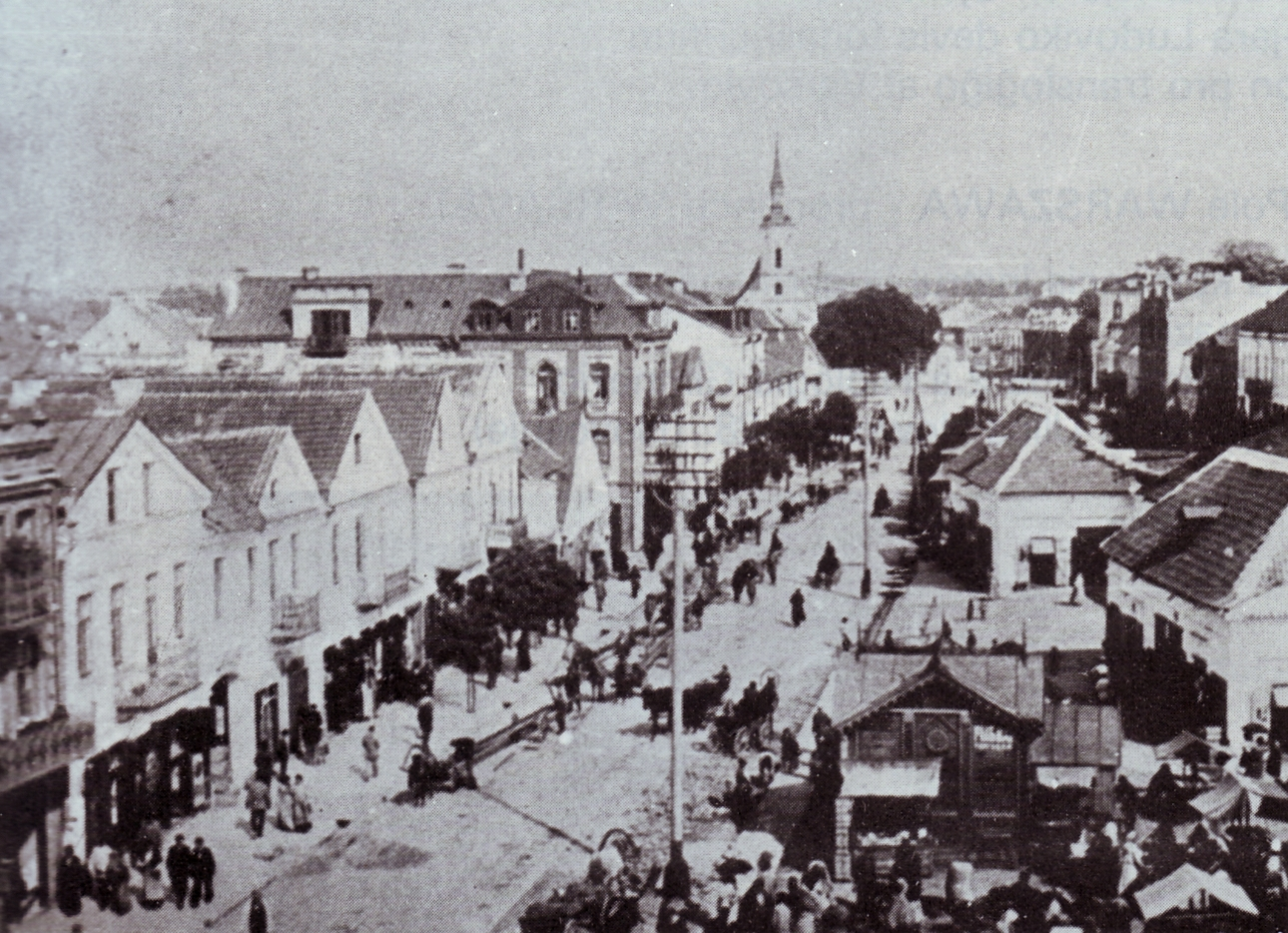
Białystok city center around 1900

- 1901 – Population: 65,781.
- 1905 – Chernoe Znamia political group formed.
- 1906 – 14–16 June: Białystok pogrom of Jews by the Russians.
- 1910 – Białystok Power Station commissioned.
- 1912
  - Tsarist prison built.
  - Population: 98,170.
- 1913
  - City's first Polish scout troop founded.
  - Great Synagogue built.
- 1915
  - City becomes capital of the Bialystok-Grodno District of the German-controlled territory of Ober-Ost during World War I.
  - 29 November: Polish Real Gymnasium founded.
- 1918
  - 11–13 November: Poles disarmed the Germans following the restoration of Polish independence.
  - 14 November: City re-occupied by Germany.
- 1919
  - Białystok part of the re-established Polish state, capital of the Białystok Voivodeship
  - Białostoczek becomes part of city.
- 1920
  - 22 September: Battle of Białystok – Polish victory over the invading Russian forces.
  - Jagiellonia Białystok football club formed.

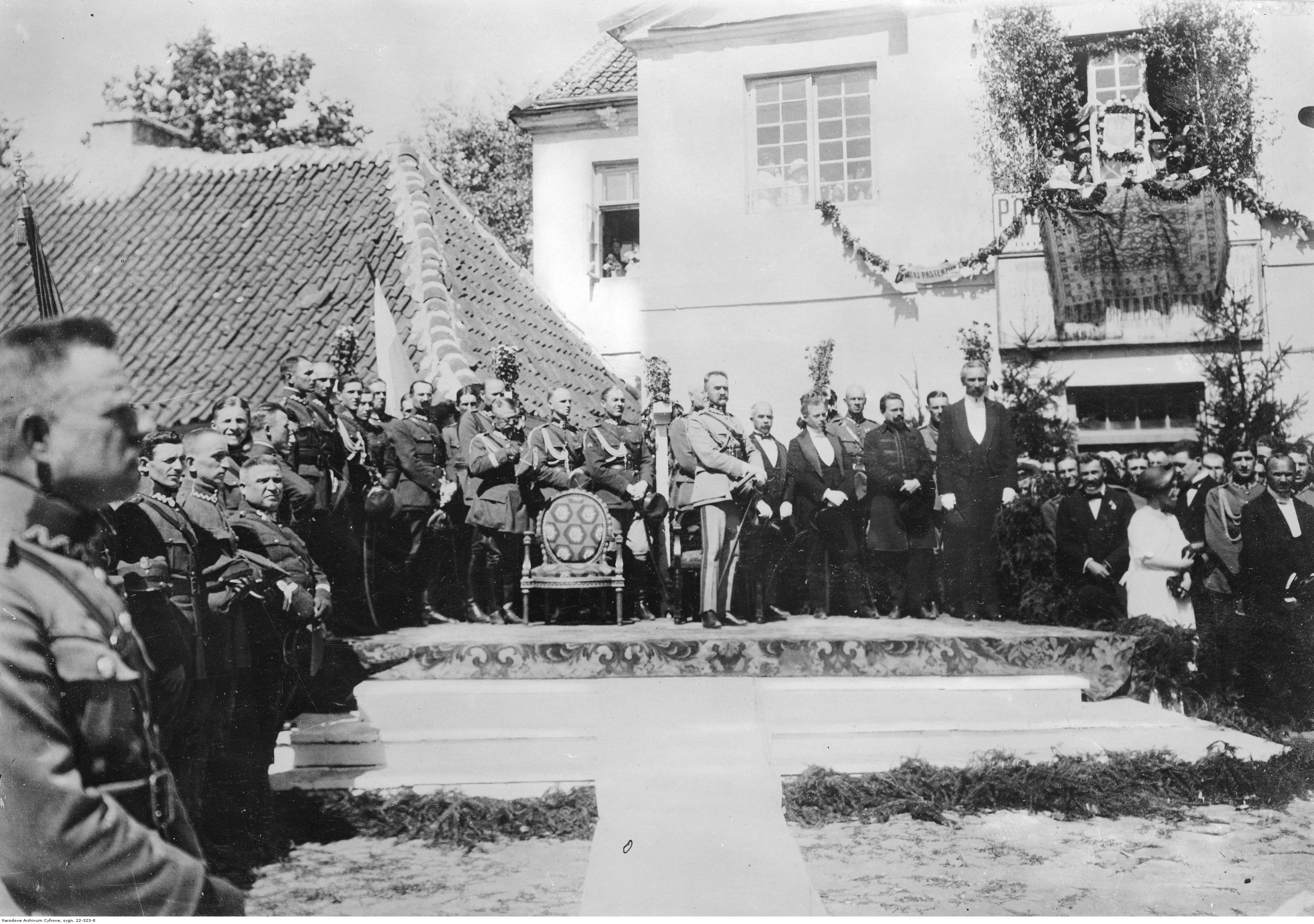
Józef Piłsudski's visit to Białystok in 1921

- 1921 – Białystok confirmed as part of Poland.
- 1928 – Polmos Białystok founded.
- 1934 – Seweryn Nowakowski, considered one of the greatest mayors of Białystok, becomes mayor.
- 1937
  - Podlaska Cavalry Brigade of the Polish Army formed and stationed in Białystok.
  - Population: 100,101.
- 1938 – Białystok Municipal Theatre built.

=== World War II (1939–1945) ===
- 1939
  - September: German occupation after the invasion of Poland, which started World War II
  - 20–21 September: The German Einsatzgruppe IV entered the city to commit crimes against the population.
  - 22 September: City handed over by the Germans to the Soviet Union in accordance with the Molotov–Ribbentrop Pact. Soviet occupation begins.
  - October: Pre-war mayor Seweryn Nowakowski arrested by the NKVD and probably deported to the USSR; his fate remains unknown.
  - November: City annexed to the Byelorussian Soviet Socialist Republic; and capital of the Belastok Region.

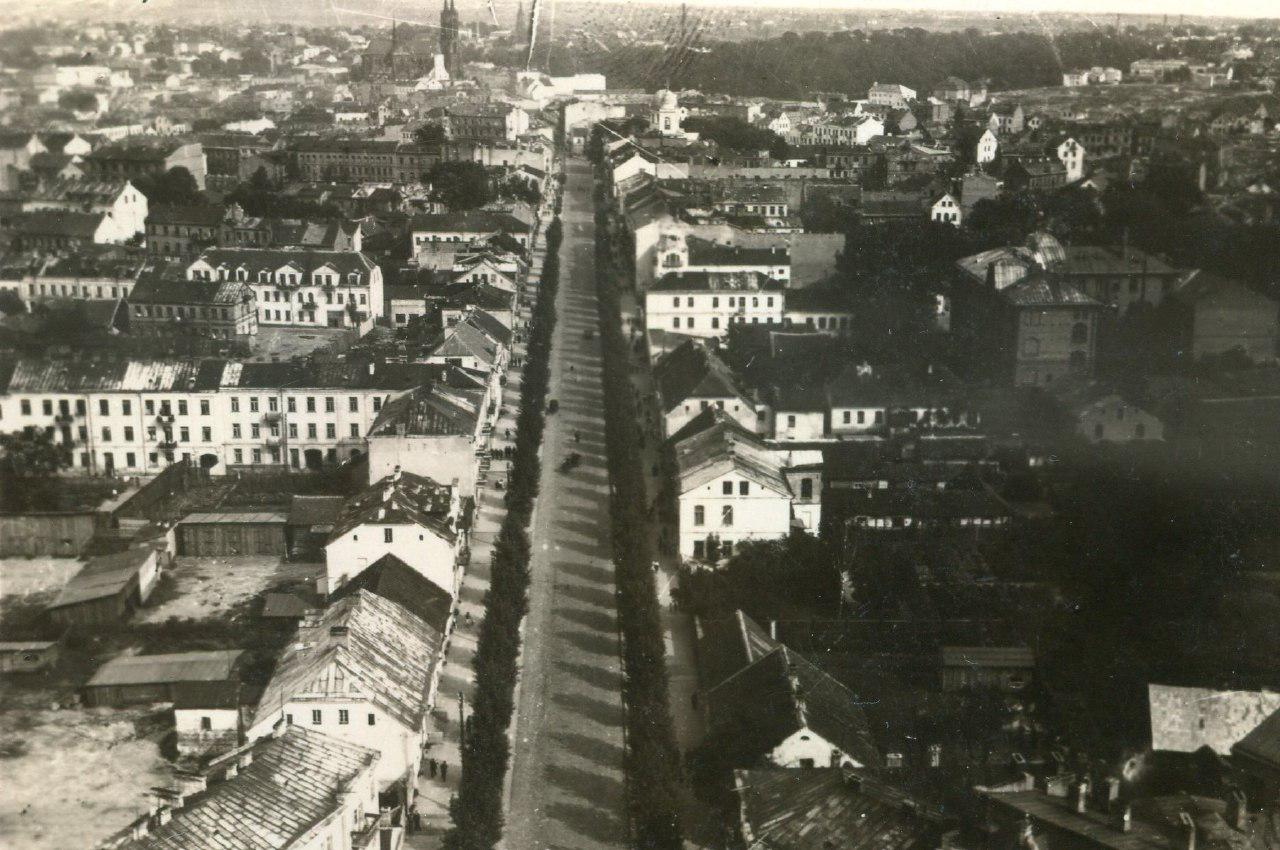
Lipowa Street in 1940

- 1940 – 17 July: Ryszard Kaczorowski, member of the local Polish resistance movement and future President of Poland in exile, arrested by the NKVD.
- 1940–1941 – Mass deportations of some 20,000 Polish citizens by the Russians from the Białystok Fabryczny railway station to the USSR, incl. Siberia (see Soviet repressions of Polish citizens (1939–1946)).
- 1941
  - 27 June: City occupation by German forces begins. On that day, approximately 2,000 to 3,000 of Białystok's Jews were massacred by the Ordnungspolizei.
  - City becomes capital of Bezirk Białystok.
  - July: Jewish ghetto established by occupying Nazi Germans.
  - Autumn: Oflag 57 prisoner-of-war camp moved from Ostrołęka to Białystok.
  - 14 October: The German 13th Reserve Police Battalion carried out a massacre of 134 POWs, mostly Jews.
  - 30 October: The German 13th Reserve Police Battalion carried out a massacre of 166 POWs.
- 1942
  - 25 May: Oflag 57 POW camp dissolved.
  - July: Stalag 316 POW camp moved from Wołkowysk to Białystok.
  - 2 November: The Germans established a forced labour camp for Jewish men.
  - 5 November: Polish partisans of the Home Army liberated a group of prisoners from the German prison.
- 1943
  - February: The German Sicherheitspolizei begins deportations of Poles including teenage boys from the local Nazi prison to the Stutthof concentration camp.
  - 20 February: Stalag 316 POW camp dissolved.
  - 16 August: Białystok Ghetto Uprising.
  - 21 August: Transport of Białystok children. Jewish children deported by the occupiers from Białystok to Theresienstadt concentration camp in German-occupied Czechoslovakia.

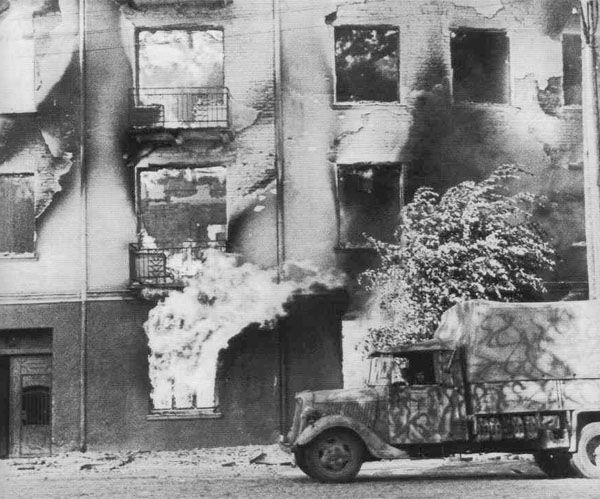
Soviet bombing damages in 1944

- 1944
  - July: occupied by the Soviets
  - mass arrests of Polish resistance members by the Soviets, around 1,200 Poles placed in the local prison by 7 November.
  - September: the city returned to Poland, although with a Soviet-installed communist regime, capital of the part of the Białystok Voivodeship
  - 8 November: deportation of 1,030 arrested Poles by the Russians from the local prison to Ostashkov.
  - 12 November: deportation of 1,014 arrested Poles by the Russians from the local prison to Ostashkov.
  - 24 November: deportation of 900 arrested Poles by the Russians from the local prison to Ostashkov.
  - 27 December: deportation of 790 arrested Poles by the Russians from the local prison to Novomoskovsk (then Stalinogorsk).
- 1945 – 30 January: deportation of 1,242 arrested Poles by the Russians from the local prison to Skopin.

=== 1945–2000 ===
- 1946 – Population: 56,759.
- 1947 – Polska Młodzież Zbrojna (Polish Armed Youth) Polish anti-communist resistance organization founded.
- 1948
  - Hetman Białystok football club formed.
  - Biały Sztandar (White Banner) Polish anti-communist resistance organization founded.
- 1949
  - April: Marway Polish anti-communist resistance organization founded.
  - June: Polska Organizacja Walki o Wolność i Niepodległość (Polish Organization for the Struggle for Freedom and Independence) anti-communist resistance organization founded.
  - Podlaskie Museum in Białystok founded.
  - Młody Las (Young Forest) Polish anti-communist resistance organization founded.
- 1950
  - 3 February: Medical University of Białystok established.
  - June: Chrześcijańsko-Demokratyczny Ruch Podziemny (Christian Democratic Underground Movement) Polish anti-communist resistance organization founded.
- 1951
  - July: Białe Orły (White Eagles) Polish anti-communist resistance organization founded.
  - August: Polska Organizacja Podziemna (Polish Underground Organization) Polish anti-communist resistance organization founded.
  - 1 September: Gazeta Współczesna newspaper begins publication.
- 1952 – Mściwa Trójka (Vengeful Trio) Polish anti-communist resistance organization founded.
- 1953 – Białystok Puppet Theatre established.
- 1956 – Manifestation of support for the Hungarian Revolution of 1956. Mass raising of funds, food, medical supplies and blood donation for Hungarian insurgents (see also Hungary–Poland relations).
- 1960 – Islamic Religious Community in Białystok established.
- 1972 – Białystok City Stadium opens.

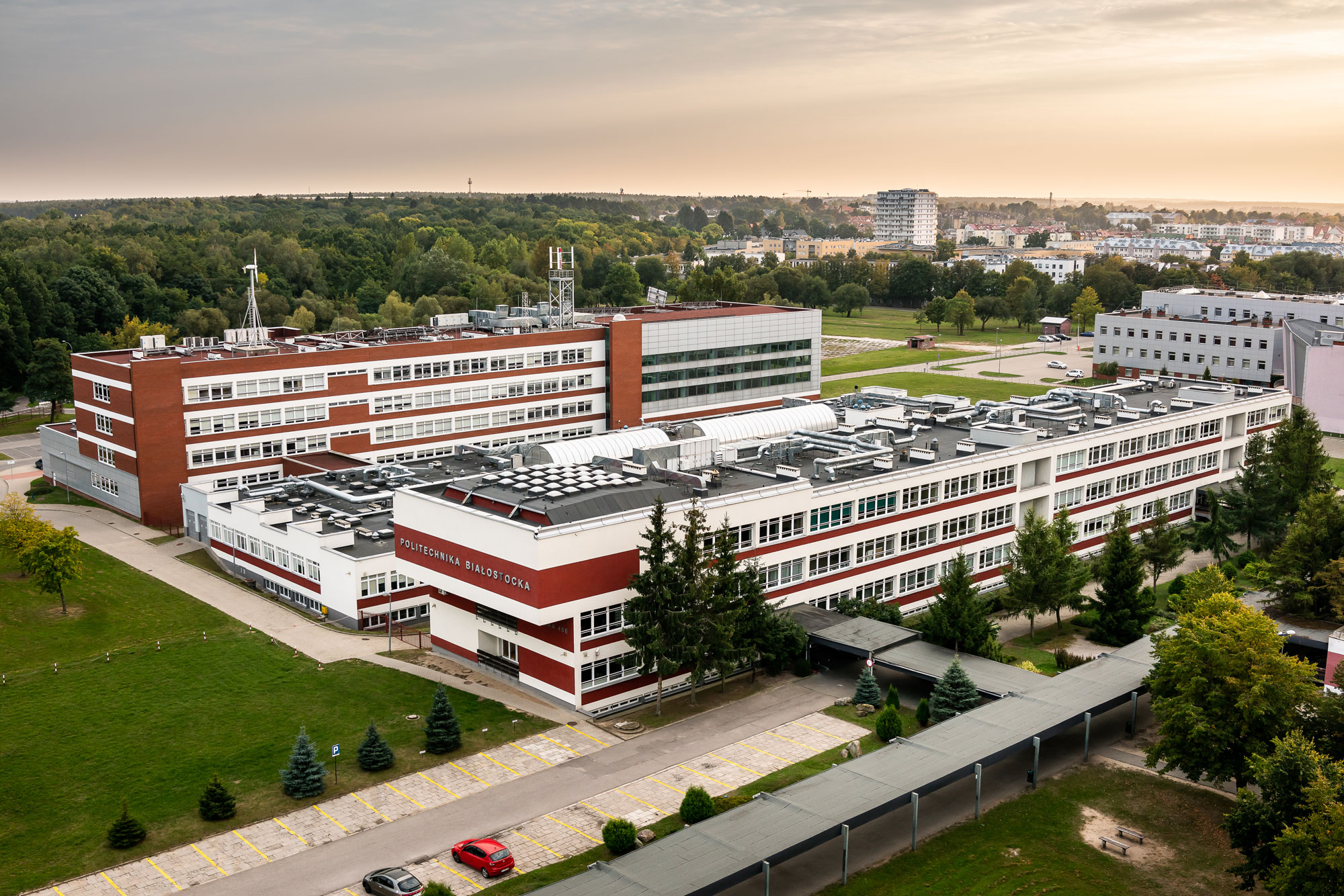
Białystok University of Technology

- 1974
  - Białystok University of Technology active.
  - Population: 187,100.
- 1975 – City becomes capital of the Białystok Voivodeship (1975–98).
- 1990
  - Białystok History Museum founded.
  - Lech Rutkowski becomes mayor.
  - Piłsudski monument, Białystok installed at Kościuszko Square.
- 1991 – Roman Catholic Diocese of Białystok established.
- 1992 – Roman Catholic Diocese of Białystok elevated to Archdiocese.
- 1998 – Population: 283,937 (estimate).
- 1999 – City becomes capital of the Podlaskie Voivodeship.

== 21st century ==
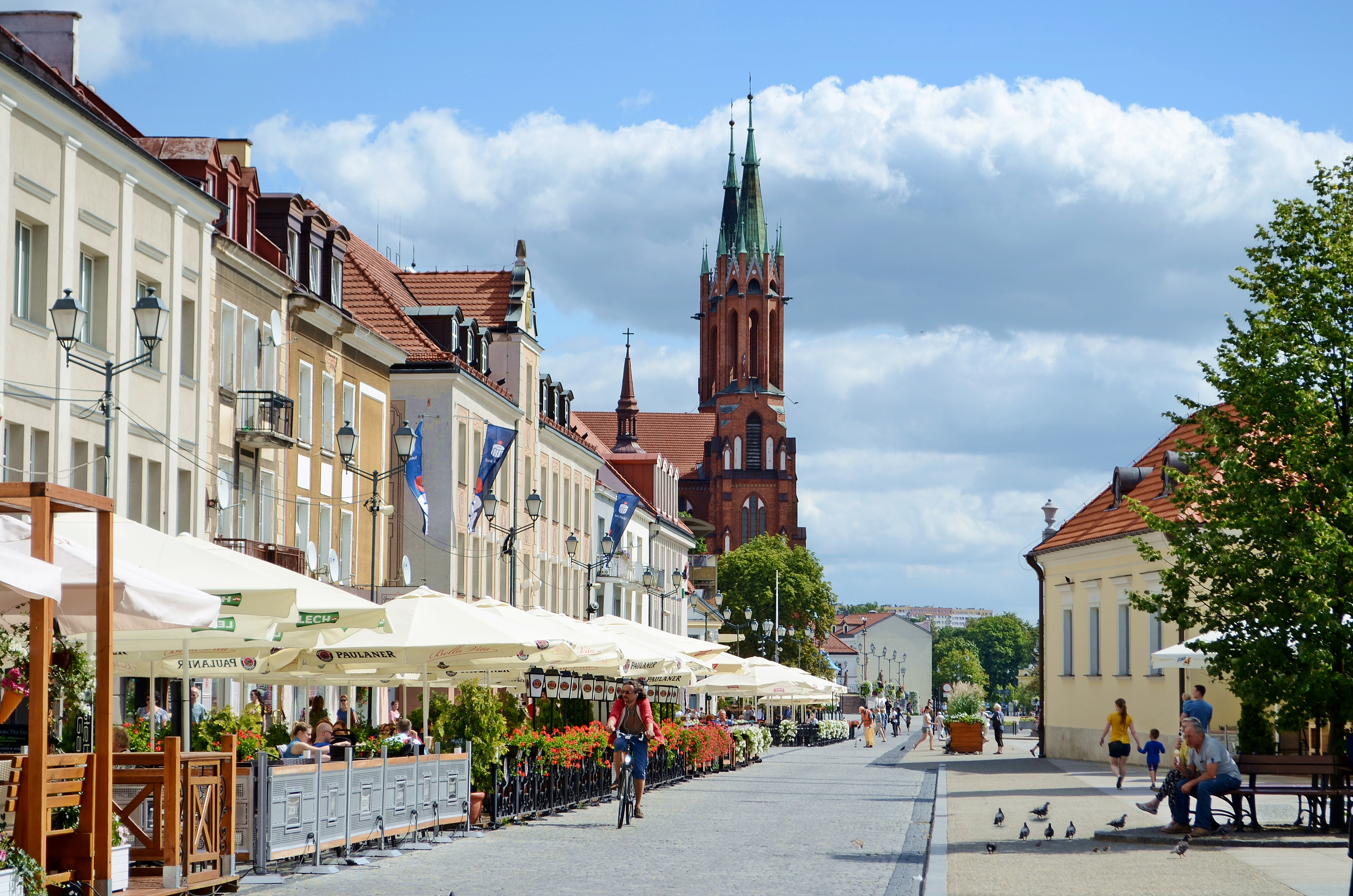
Białystok city center in 2017

- 2004 – City divided into 27 administrative districts.
- 2006 – Tadeusz Truskolaski becomes mayor.
- 2008 – Jewish Heritage Trail in Białystok created.
- 2009
  - Zamenhof Centre opens.
  - World Congress of Esperanto held in city.
- 2011 – 4 March: Honorary Consulate of Croatia opened (see Croatia–Poland relations).
- 2012 – Population: 294,900.
- 2013 – 10 July: Honorary Consulate of Finland opened (see Finland–Poland relations).
- 2015 – December: Honorary Consulate of Luxembourg opened (see Luxembourg–Poland relations).
- 2018
  - 1 March: Danuta Siedzikówna monument unveiled.
  - 11 April: Monument to the victims of Soviet deportations of Poles during World War II unveiled at the Białystok Fabryczny railway station.
- 2020 – Monument to Polish mothers deported to Siberia unveiled.
- 2021 – 19 September: Khachkar commemorating the victims of the Armenian genocide and Armenian soldiers fallen in the battle for Artsakh unveiled.
- 2022
  - 29 May: Monument to soldiers of the pre-war Polish 42nd Infantry Regiment-footballers of Jagiellonia Białystok unveiled in front of the municipal stadium.
  - 23 June: Honorary Consulate of Kazakhstan opened (see Kazakhstan–Poland relations).
  - 29 June: Honorary Consulate of Serbia opened (see Poland–Serbia relations).
- 2023
  - 24 May: Polish–Uzbekistani Historical Commission founded (see Poland–Uzbekistan relations).
  - 23 November: Honorary Consulate of Latvia opened (see Latvia–Poland relations).

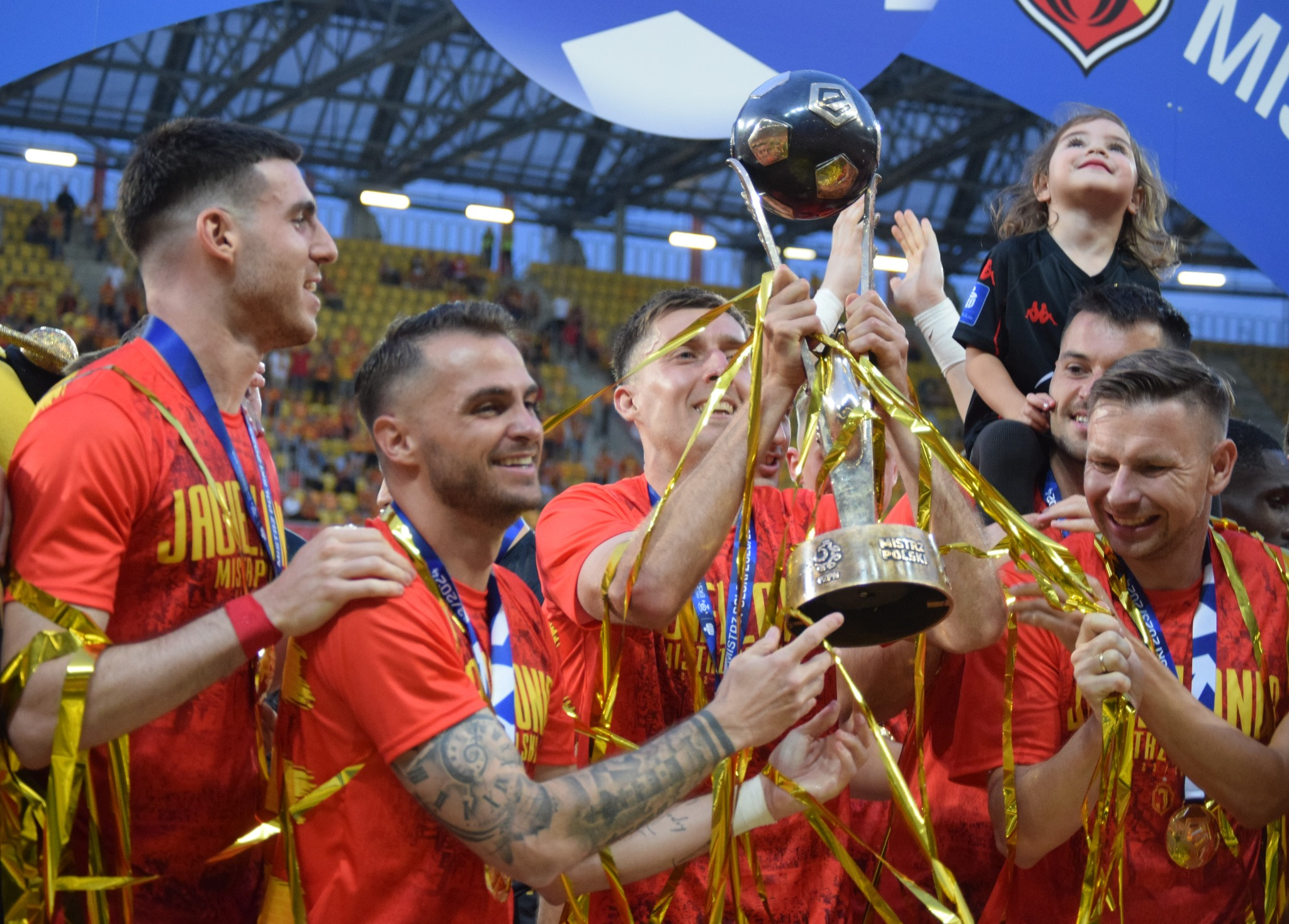
Jagiellonia Białystok players celebrate winning the 2023–24 Polish Championship

- 2024 – 25 May: Jagiellonia Białystok won its first Polish football championship.

== See also ==
- History of Białystok
- Other names of Białystok, e.g. Belostok, Bielostok, Byelostok

== Bibliography ==
- "Byelostok", Jewish Encyclopedia, vol. 3, New York, 1907, hdl:2027/osu.32435029752920
- "Byelostok" . Encyclopædia Britannica. Vol. 4 (11th ed.). 1910. p. 895.
- "Bialystok". Russia. Leipzig: Karl Baedeker. 1914. hdl:2027/gri.ark:/13960/t6zw2kd65. OCLC 1328163 – via HathiTrust.
- William Henry Beable (1919), "Byelystok", Russian Gazetteer and Guide, London: Russian Outlook
- Rebecca Kobrin (7 May 2010). Jewish Bialystok and its Diaspora. Indiana University Press. ISBN 978-0-253-00428-4.
