= Divine Mercy Sanctuary (Białystok) =

Divine Mercy Sanctuary in Białystok
- Sanktuarium Miłosierdzia Bożego w Białymstoku
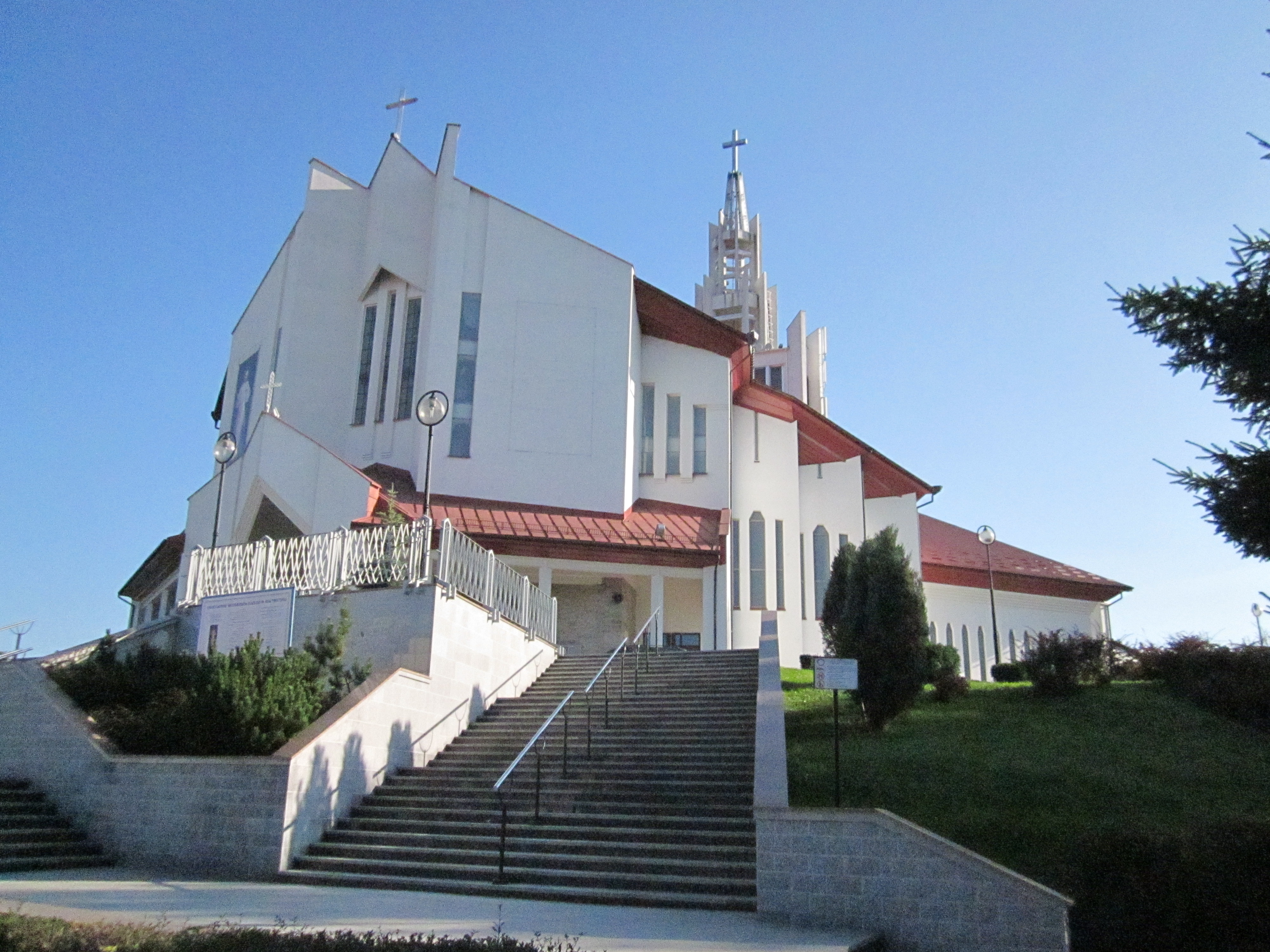
- Divine Mercy Sanctuary in Białystok
- 53.1453°N 23.1558°E
- Location: plac Błogosławionego Księdza Michała Sopoćki 1, Białostoczek, Białystok

History
- Consecrated: 27 April 1984

Architecture
- Style: Modenism

Divine Mercy Sanctuary in Białystok (Polish: Sanktuarium Miłosierdzia Bożego w Białymstoku) is a Roman Catholic church in the district of Białostoczek District at the plac Błogosławionego Księdza Michała Sopoćki 1.

== History ==
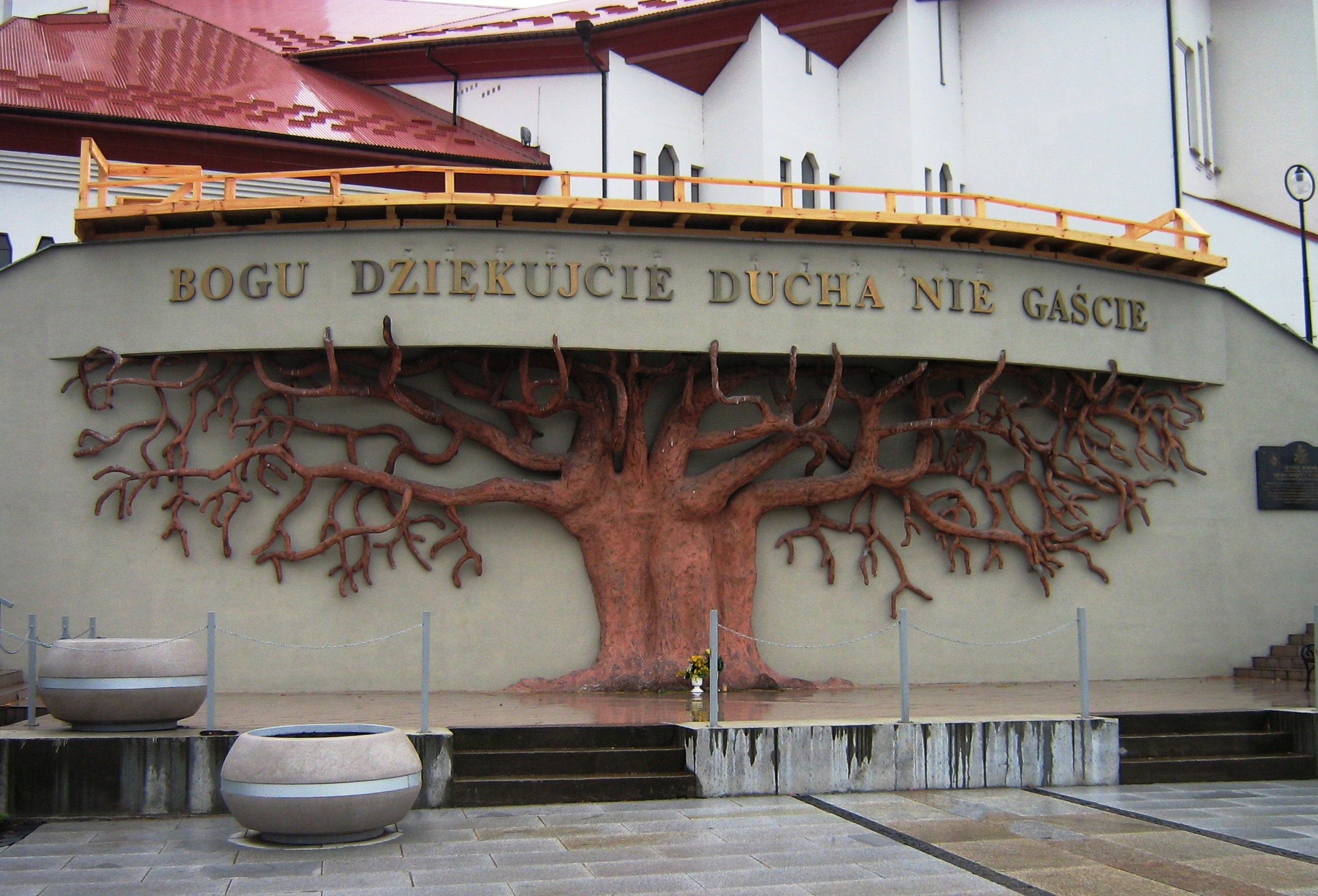
The Papal Altar

In August 1982, the Municipal National Council (the city's municipal council) received a letter asking for permission to build a church. This was requested by the residents from Poleska Street. The positive answer came after a few months, in December of the same year. This took place after previous unsuccessful attempts by priest Zbigniew Krupski to obtain permission to build a temple at Poleska Street. It was erected in 1984. In September 1980, an independent pastoral institution of St. Family, separated from the parish of the Assumption of the Blessed Virgin Mary. On December 22, 1981, additional land for the construction of a church was included in the Spatial Development Plan of the City of Białystok. Due to this situation, in 1982 the Parish of Holy Family based at Ogrodowa street separated from the parish of the Assumption of the Blessed Virgin Mary and additionally from the parish of St. Rocha.

In 1982, a competition was announced for the design of a new branch church in the district. Białystok. The competition was won by the project of Andrzej Nowakowski from Białystok and Janusz Pawłowski from Olecko. On April 27, 1984, the area for the construction of the church was consecrated, and on May 17, the parish received permission to build a church and a catechetical building. In September 1986, the catechetical building was put into use, and on December 22, 1986, Bishop Edward Kisiel consecrated the lower church of Divine Mercy at Radzymińska street. Due to the fact that the newly established parish did not have apartments for priests, the construction of a rectory began in 1988. On November 30, 1988, the mortal remains of the Servant of God, Fr. Michał Sopoćko were moved from the parish cemetery and placed in a special crypt in the lower church - the Sanctuary. On June 24, 1990, the parish of the Holy Family was divided and a new parish of Divine Mercy was established, covering the area of the Białostoczek estate. In 1988 the remains of Michał Sopoćko, the spiritual director of Faustina Kowalska, was moved here. In 1993 also a relic of Faustina Kowalska was set. In 1996 besides the church the papal altar from 1991 was reconstructed. Consecration of the church was held in 2007.

On September 28, 2008 the solemn beatification of Michał Sopoćko took place here. Among others, cardinals Angelo Amato, Stanisław Dziwisz, Audrys Bačkis and Józef Glemp, about 100 bishops as well as presidents of Poland: Ryszard Kaczorowski, Lech Kaczyński and Bronisław Komorowski were present.

== See also ==
- Michał Sopoćko
- Faustyna Kowalska
- Divine Mercy (Catholic devotion)
- Divine Mercy Sanctuary (Kraków)
