= Periodization of Polish history =

The periodization of Polish history is the issue of identifying the chronological historical periods in the history of Poland. There are various periodizations, some specialized in matters of political or legal history. The most consistent date in these periodizations is the fall of the Polish–Lithuanian Commonwealth in 1795, although there are exceptions even here. Differences in many periodizations stem, among other factors, from the fact that different authors adopted different criteria, such as legal and formal elements (like individual legal acts) or aspects of social consciousness.

Many historians of Polish history have attempted to systematize, organize, and periodize it, starting with Adam Naruszewicz in the 18th century.

Below, later periodizations are presented in chronological order.

== Naruszewicz's periodization ==
The division of Polish history into periods according to Naruszewicz is evident in his partially completed project Historia narodu polskiego (History of the Polish Nation), where he applied a division into the pre-Christian period, the Piast dynasty period, and outlined a proposal for further division (into the Jagiellonian dynasty period and the period of free election).

== Periodization by the Society of Friends of Learning ==
As early as the beginning of the 19th century, the Warsaw Society of Friends of Learning, with members such as Stanisław Staszic, proposed the following division (in Odezwa w sprawie prospektu historii narodu polskiego [Appeal Regarding the Prospectus for the History of the Polish Nation], 1809):

- I – until the introduction of Christianity;
- II – from 966 to 1138;
- III – from Władysław II the Exile to 1370;
- IV – from Louis I of Hungary to 1572;
- V – from 1572 to the 1788 Sejm;
- VI – from 1788 to 1795;
- VII – The history of the nation under foreign rule, until the establishment of the Duchy of Warsaw.

== Lelewel's periodization ==
In 1813, Joachim Lelewel proposed the following division (in Historia Polski do końca panowania Stefana Batorego [History of Poland until the End of the Reign of Stefan Batory]):

- I – Poland conquering: autocracy (890–1139);
- II – Poland divided: aristocracy (1139–1374);
- III – flourishing Poland: Noble Republic (1374–1586);
- IV – declining Poland: disorder, corruption of the throne, arbitrariness of magnates, noble disorder (1586–1764);
- V – reborn Poland: expansion of freedoms from one class to the entire nation.

== Moraczewski's periodization ==
In 1838, Jędrzej Moraczewski proposed the following division (in Jak najdogodniej oznaczać epoki historii [The Most Convenient Way to Designate Historical Epochs]):

- Period I – until 1138;
- Period II – until 1370;
- Period III – until 1506;
- Period IV – until 1586;
- Period V – until 1668.

== Szajnocha's periodization ==
In the 1850s, Karol Szajnocha proposed a Hegelian triad for dividing Polish history (unpublished notes):

- Epoch I – until 1157 (Noble Republic, Poland unites as one);
- Epoch II – 1157–1648 (moral growth and integration through civilizing influence of the West, i.e., Catholic and feudal civilization);
- Epoch III – 1648–1795 (a synthesis of the characteristics of previous epochs, the emergence of an indigenous Noble Republic).

== Plebański's periodization ==
In 1854, Józef Kazimierz Plebański proposed a division (in O zadaniu dziejopisarstwa polskiego [On the Task of Polish Historiography]) into four epochs:

- I – from the beginnings of Polish nationality from the Slavic heritage to the establishment of national representation, i.e., from the mid-9th century to the end of the 15th century;
- II – the independent rule of the Polish nation in the 16th century, until the mid-17th century;
- III – Polish nationality weakened by foreign influence (emulation of France and Austria) both externally and internally, subject to Russian violence: 1648–1791;
- IV – rebirth of Poland, from the Constitution of 3 May 1791 to the present.

== Bobrzyński's periodization ==
In 1881, Michał Bobrzyński distinguished the following periods (in Dzieje Polski [The History of Poland]):

- Patriarchal state, from the beginning of Polish statehood to around the mid-13th century;
- Patrimonial state, from the mid-13th century to the end of the 15th century;
- Modern state, from the end of the 16th century to the period of the partitions.

== Dylewski's periodization ==
In 1890, Edmund Dylewski distinguished the following periods (in O podziale historii prawa polskiego na okresy [On the Division of the History of Polish Law into Periods]):

- Period I – the Slavic principles era, lasting from the earliest times to the adoption of Christianity;
- Period II – the era of the formation of the Polish state and the supremacy of princely law, from the end of the 10th century to the end of the 13th century;
- Period III – the era of the breakdown of princely law and the striving for universal privilege, from the end of the 13th century to the beginning of the 16th century;
- Period IV – the era of the Sejm and the dominance of the nobility, from the organization of the Sejm in the early 16th century to the Third Partition in 1795;
- Period V – the post-partition era.

== Kutrzeba's periodization ==
In the pre-war period, Stanisław Kutrzeba distinguished the following periods (in Historia ustroju Polski w zarysie [Outline of the History of the Polish System], 1905; and later works):

- Preliminary period – the tribal organization, up to the mid-10th century;
- Period I – princely law, from the formation of the state to 1180;
- Period II – social organization, also known as the immunity period, from 1180 to 1370 or 1374;
- Period III – the estate period, from 1370 (1374) to 1569 or 1572;
- Period IV – the Sejm period (Noble Republic), from 1569 (1572) to 1764;
- Period V – constitutional reforms, from 1764 to the fall of the country;
- Period VI – the post-partition era.

== Siemieński's periodization ==
In the pre-war period, Józef Siemieński distinguished the following periods (in Podział historii ustroju polski na okresy [Division of the History of the Polish System into Periods], 1925; and Historia ustroju Polski w zarysie [Outline of the History of the Polish System], 1925):

- Period I – absolute monarchy of the early Piasts, from the mid-10th century to 1228;
- Period II – aristocratic monarchy of the later Piasts, from 1228 to the nihil novi privilege of 1505;
- Period III – noble democracy, from 1505 to the adoption of the Constitution of 3 May 1791;
- Period IV – modern democracy, from the adoption of the Constitution of 3 May 1791 to the fall of the country.

== Balzer's periodization ==
In the pre-war period, Oswald Balzer distinguished the following periods (in Historia ustroju Polski [History of the Polish System], 1933, and earlier works):

- Preliminary period – "prehistoric";
- Period I – princely law, from 963;
- Period II – self-government of estate communities (communitates), from the early 13th century to the early 16th century, i.e., to the nihil novi constitution of 1505;
- Period III – the Noble Republic, from the early 16th century (with the nihil novi constitution of 1505 as a boundary between periods) to the Great Sejm (1788, or possibly to 3 May 1791);
- Period IV – the period of reforms leading towards a modern state, from 1788, more precisely from the Constitution of 3 May 1791, suppressed in its infancy by the last two partitions of Poland.

== Bardach's periodization ==
According to Juliusz Bardach (in Historia państwa i prawa polskiego [History of the Polish State and Law], 1955, and other works), representing a Marxist approach, the following periods can be distinguished:

- I. Polish state and law in the feudal era:
  - Semi-patriarchal, semi-feudal, proto-feudal, tribal states – the period and formation of the Polish state, from the 7th century to the mid-10th century; this was a transitional period from tribal to feudal systems;
  - Early feudal state, from the second half of the 10th century to 1138;
  - State during the period of feudal fragmentation (1138–1320);
  - Estate monarchy (estate state), from the third decade of the 14th century to the mid-15th century (1320–1454);
  - Noble democracy, from the mid-15th century to the end of the 16th century (1454–1606);
  - Magnate oligarchy, from the early 17th century to the 1770s (1606–1764);
  - Times of reform and decline of the Noble Republic, the period of attempts to establish a constitutional monarchy (1765–1795);
  - System and law in the Polish lands after the partitions during the period of feudal decay and the formation of capitalist relations (1795 to 1848 or 1864).
- II. State and law in the capitalist era in the Polish lands:
  - Partition and capitalist law in the Polish lands up to 1918;
  - Bourgeois-landowner Republic, later known as the Second Polish Republic (1918–1939);
  - Nazi occupation (1939–1944).
- III. Polish state and law in the socialist era:
  - State system and law of the Polish People's Republic, from 1944.

== Uruszczak's periodization ==
In 2002, Wacław Uruszczak presented his own division for the pre-partition periods (in O periodyzacji historii ustroju dawnej Polski [On the Periodization of the History of the Political System of Old Poland]):

- I. Piast monarchy (c. 950–1370):
  - Early Medieval autocracy (c. 950 to 1227);
  - Piast polity (1227–1320);
  - Corona Regni Poloniae (1320–1370).
- II. Kingdom of the Andegavins and Jagiellons (1370–1572):
  - Magnate rule (1370–1385);
  - Aristocratic monarchy of the early Jagiellons (1385–1492);
  - Parliamentary monarchy of the Golden Age (1492–1569/1572).
- III. The Commonwealth of the Two Nations (1573–1795):
  - Elective-parliamentary monarchy of the Silver Age (1573–1668);
  - Commonwealth in crisis (1668–1763);
  - Commonwealth in the process of reform (1764–1795).

== See also ==
- Historiography
- Timeline of Polish history
- Periodization
- Prehistory and protohistory of Poland
