= Michał Sopoćko =

Polish Catholic priest (1888–1975)

Blessed Michael Sopoćko
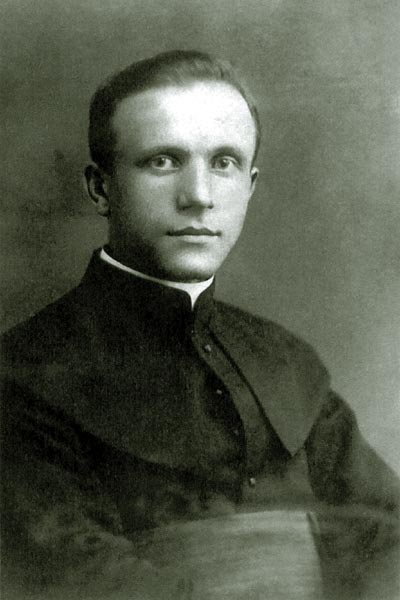
- Father Michał Sopoćko

Priest
- Born: 1 November 1888; Yusawshchyna, Ashmyany, Russian Empire
- Died: 15 February 1975 (aged 86); Białystok, People's Republic of Poland (today Poland)
- Resting place: Farny Cemetery
- Venerated in: Roman Catholic Church
- Beatified: 28 September 2008, Białystok, Poland by Cardinal Angelo Amato
- Feast: 15 February
- Attributes: Cassock
- Patronage: Białystok

Michael Sopoćko (Polish: Michał Sopoćko [ˈmixaw sɔˈpɔt͡ɕkɔ]; 1 November 1888 – 15 February 1975) was a Polish Catholic priest and professor at Vilnius University. He is best known as the spiritual director of Faustina Kowalska. He was beatified by Pope Benedict XVI in 2008.

== Biography ==
Sopoćko was born to Polish parents in 1888 in Yusawshchyna (also known as Navasady) near Valozhyn within the Russian Empire, now Belarus. He entered Vilnius Priest Seminary in 1910 and was ordained in 1914. He was a priest in Vilnius (1914–1918) and then a chaplain in the army in Warsaw and Vilnius during World War I. After obtaining his doctorate in theology in 1926, he became the spiritual director at the seminary in Vilnius and, in 1928, professor of pastoral theology at Stefan Batory University, in Vilnius.

=== Divine Mercy ===
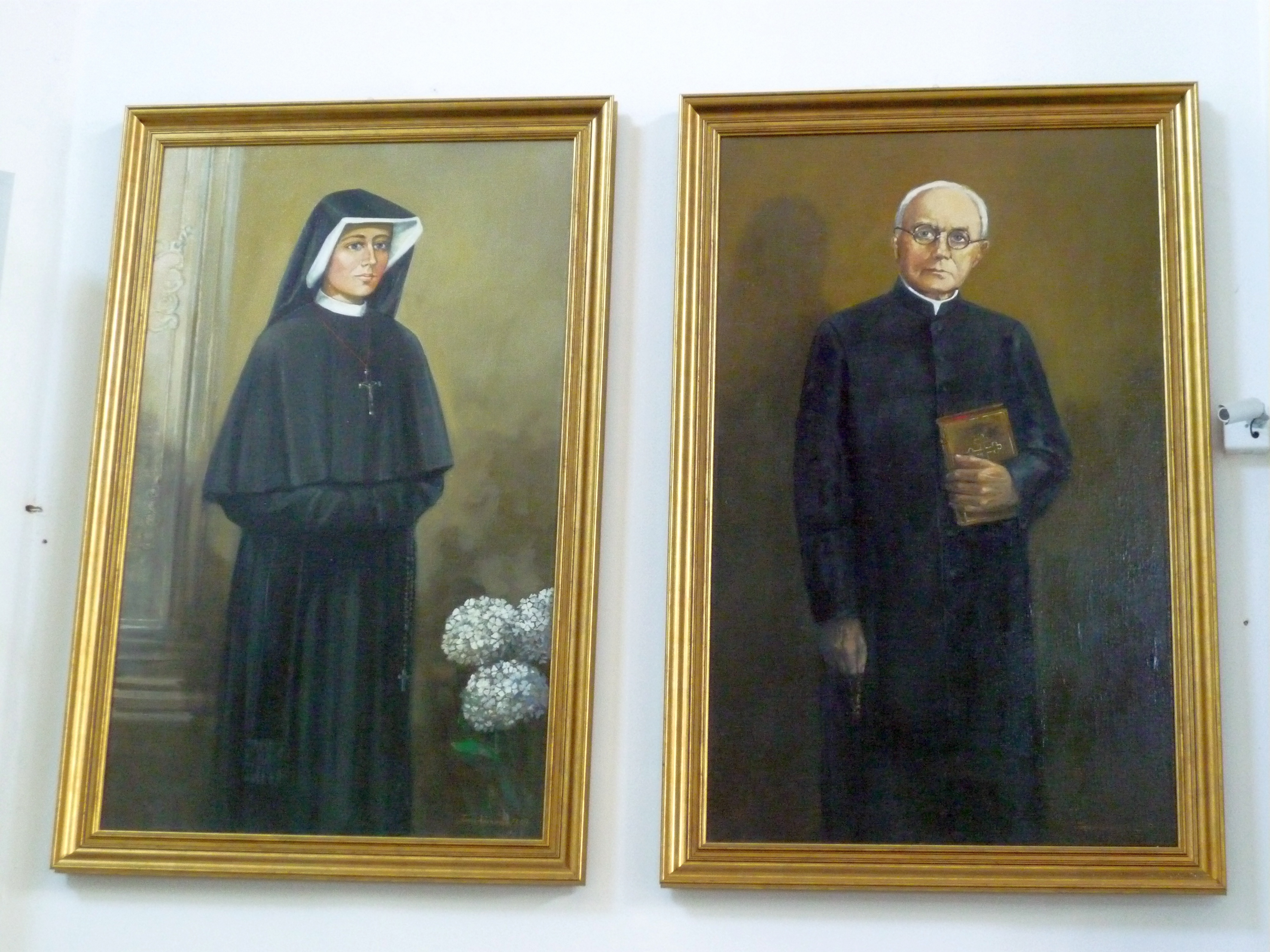
Paintings of Faustina and Sopoćko in Łomża

Sopoćko was very supportive of the Divine Mercy devotion of Faustina Kowalska and in her diary (Notebook V, item 1238) she stated: "This priest is a great soul, entirely filled with God." Since 1931 Kowalska had been trying (without success) to find someone to paint the Divine Mercy image until Sopoćko became her confessor in the middle of 1933. By January 1934, Sopoćko arranged for the artist Eugeniusz Kazimirowski (who was also a professor at the university) to paint the image.

On Friday 26 April 1935 Sopoćko delivered the first sermon ever on the Divine Mercy – and Kowalska attended the sermon. The first Mass during which the Divine Mercy image was displayed was on 28 April 1935, the Divine Mercy Sunday (the first after Easter). Sopoćko managed to obtain permission to place the painting within the Gate of Dawn in Vilnius as he celebrated the Mass that Sunday.

In the summer of 1936, Sopoćko wrote the first brochure on the Divine Mercy devotion and obtained the imprimatur of Archbishop Jałbrzykowski for it. The brochure carried the Divine Mercy image on the cover.

=== Congregation of the Sisters of Merciful Jesus ===
In 1942 during World War II, Sopoćko and other professors and students had to go into hiding near Vilnius for about two years. However, he used the time to establish a new religious congregation, based on the Divine Mercy messages reported by Kowalska. After the war, Sopoćko wrote the constitution for the congregation and helped the formation of what is now the Congregation of the Sisters of Merciful Jesus.

In an entry in her diary on 8 February 1935, (Notebook I, item 378), Kowalska had written that the Divine Mercy devotion would be suppressed for some time after her death but then be accepted again although Sopoćko would suffer for it. In 1959, the Vatican forbade the Divine Mercy devotion and censured Sopoćko. In 1965 Karol Wojtyła, then Archbishop of Kraków and later Pope John Paul II, opened a new investigation and submitted documents in 1968, which resulted in the reversal of the ban in 1978.

After the Second World War, when the boundaries of Poland had changed so much, Sopoćko left Vilnius. Until 1962, he had been a professor of pastoral theology at the seminary in Białystok. Meanwhile, he wrote a book Miłosierdzie Boga w dziełach Jego (Mercy of God in His works) in four volumes. He died on 15 February 1975 in Białystok, Poland, and was buried there. In 1988, his remains were transferred to the Divine Mercy Sanctuary in Białostoczek.

== Veneration ==
Sopoćko's case for beatification was started at the Vatican in 1987. In 2004, Pope John Paul II issued a decree on Sopoćko's virtues. In December 2007, Pope Benedict XVI approved of a miracle through his intercession. His solemn beatification took place on 28 September 2008 at the Sanctuary of Divine Mercy, in Białystok. An estimated 80,000 people attended, including the Polish president, Lech Kaczyński, and the speaker of the Parliament of Poland, Bronislaw Komorowski.

== Sources ==
- Odell, Catherine M. (1998). Faustina: The Apostle of Divine Mercy. Our Sunday Visitor, Incorporated. ISBN 0-87973-923-1.
- Torretto, Richard (2010). "The Image of Divine Mercy". A Divine Mercy Resource. iUniverse. ISBN 978-1-4502-3236-4.
