= Białystok Power Station =

Power station in Białostoczek, Poland

Białystok Power Plant
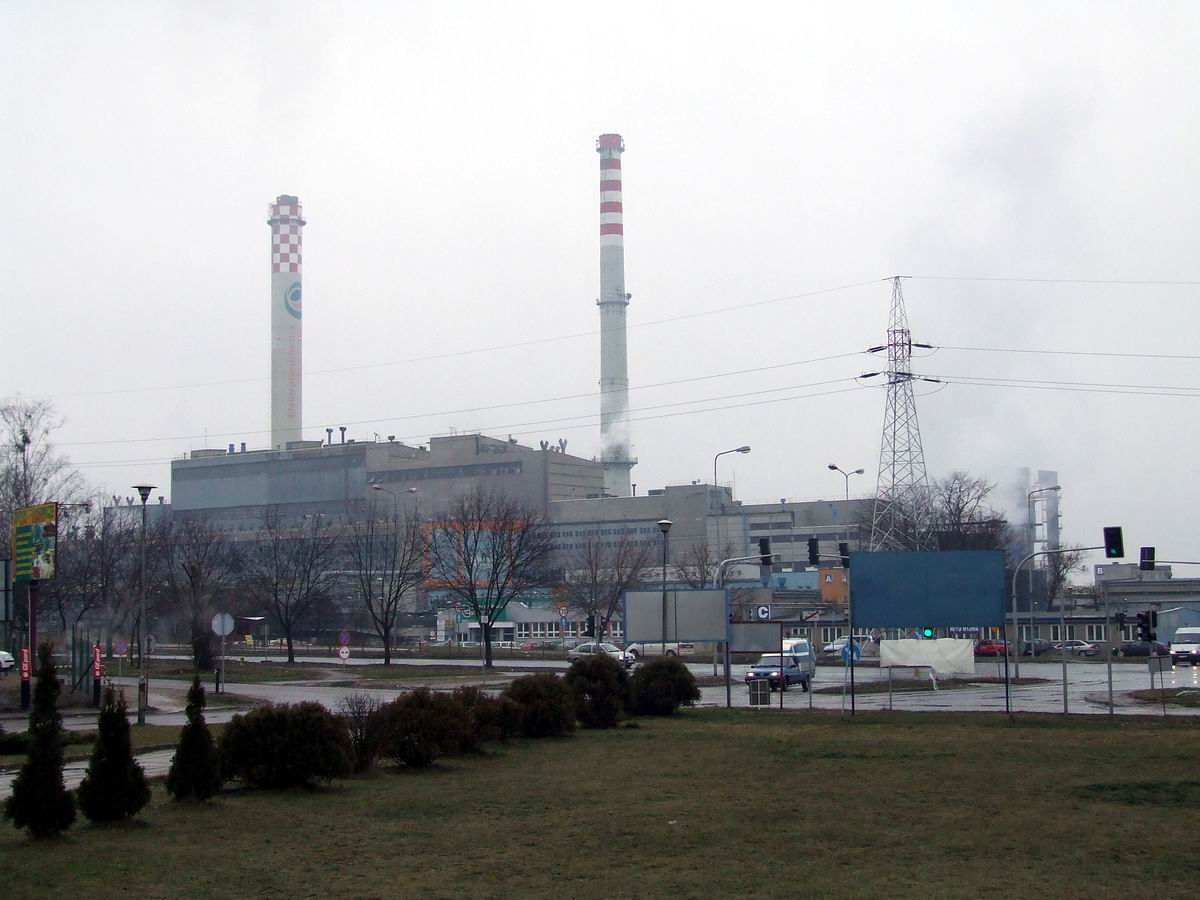
- View of the power station
- Country: Poland
- Location: Białystok
- Coordinates: 53°08′54″N 23°10′09″E
- Status: Active
- Construction began: 1965
- Commission date: 1967
- Owner: SNET S.A.

Thermal power station
- Primary fuel: Coal
- Secondary fuel: Fuel oil
- Cogeneration?: Yes

Power generation
- Nameplate capacity: 203.5 MW

External links
- Website: www.ec.bialystok.pl
- Commons: Related media on Commons

Białystok Power Station (Elektrociepłownia Białystok S.A.) is a cogeneration power station in the Białostoczek neighborhood of Białystok, a city in north-east Poland which produces both heat and electricity. The main recipient of the electricity is PGE (formerly Zakład Energetyczny Białystok) and the main recipient of the heat is Enea Wytwarzanie (formerly Miejskie Przedsiębiorstwo Energetyki Cieplnej w Białymstoku).

== History ==
In 1939 the power of the power plant reached 10 700 kW, 109 local power plants with a total capacity of 19 128 kW are operating in Podlaskie Voivodeship at that time. In 1951 reorganization of the Energy Union of the Białystok District into 3 separate plants: Zakład Sieci Elektrycznych Białystok, Elektrownia Białystok and Regions of Energy Sale. In 1958 Zakład Sieci Elektrycznych Białystok and Elektrownia Białystok were merged. 1965 saw the beginning of construction of the EC II Heat and Power Plant (currently Białystok Heat and Power Plant). In 1967 first WLM 38 water boiler at CHP II, short-circuited with the heating system of EC I and EC II were commissioned. In 1974 commissioning of the last of the WP 70 water boilers was completed. In 1978 the first BC 50 heating unit (duoblock) was put into operation. In 1990 the obsolete EC I CHP plant was shut down. On 22 January 1991 CHP Plant was separated from Zakład Energetyczny. In 1991, the last, third unit of BC 50 at EC II was commissioned. On 30 September 1993 Elektrociepłownia Białystok was transformed into a sole shareholder company of the State Treasury. On 15 February 2001 conclusion of agreement between the State Treasury and Société nationale d'électricité et de thermique (SNET S.A.) on the power plant privatization, and the latter became the company's majority shareholder.
