= Białostoczek (Białystok) =

- District (osiedle) of Białystok
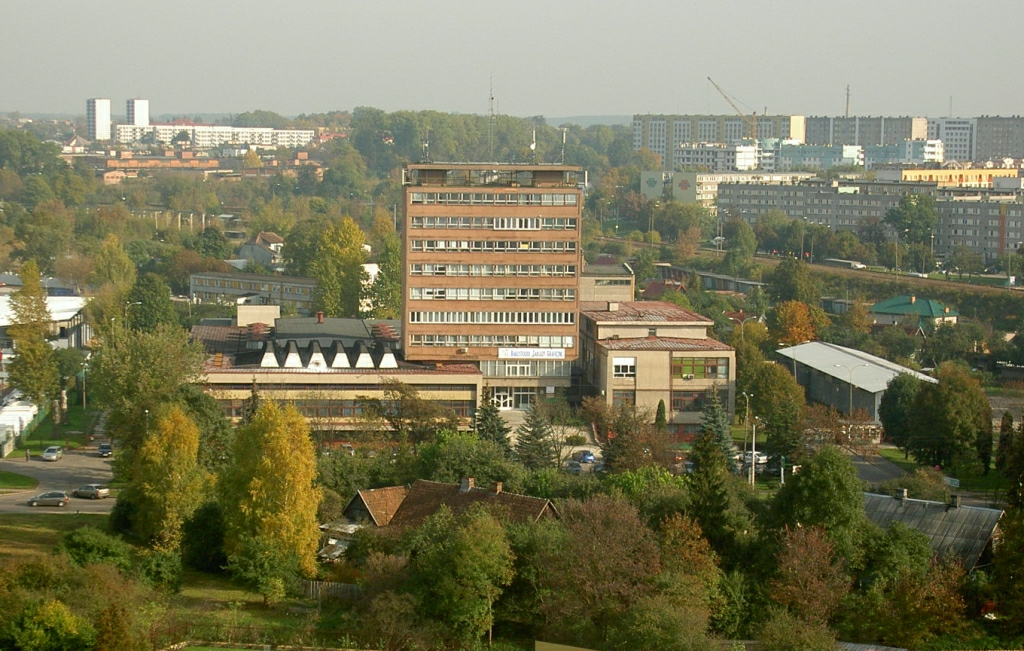

- Location of Białostoczek District within Białystok
- Coordinates: 53°9′3″N 23°9′17″E
- Country: Poland
- Voivodeship: Podlaskie
- County/City: Białystok
- Incorporated: 10 May 1919
- Notable landmarks: List: Białystok Power Station

Area
  - Total: 2.504 km^{2} (0.967 sq mi)
- Time zone: UTC+1 (CET)
  - Summer (DST): UTC+2 (CEST)
- Postal code: 15-xxx
- Area code: +48 85
- Website: http://www.bialystok.pl

Białostoczek is a district of the City of Białystok, Poland. It is a mixed residential and industrial area. Prior to its incorporation into the city in 1919, it was a separate village.

== History ==
Białostoczek originally was a grange, later a village at the Wysokostocki grange, and was founded in 1547. In the second half of the eighteenth century, Białostoczek was part of the Highland farm belonging to Jan Klemens Branicki. It was then a large village with 47 farms and an inn. At the end of the 18th century, Białostoczek had the form of a street road, and its layout was characteristic of villages founded or regulated as part of spear measurements.

Białostoczek can be seen on city maps from the times of Jan Klemens Branicki. It is already marked on the "Plan du chateauet de la ville de Bialystok" from around 1771. As "Bialystoczek" it is present on the map of New East Prussia from 1808, as well as the tsarist military plan of Bialystok from 1886. Białystok was not included in Białystok until May 10, 1919. On the plan of Białystok from the 1930s, but also from 1966 there are only a few streets in the place of today's housing estate: Białostoczek, Zagumienna, Kozłowa, Radzymińska, Suwalska, Sitarska, Bielska, Hajnowska and Sokólska. The latter, however, has a completely different course. From the Avenue of the Millennium of the Polish State to Zagumienna, it coincides with our modern street, but later it turns south and ends in the place of today's roundabout of priest Zbigniew Krupski. On the plan from 1966, two colonies are also marked: Białostoczek I and Białostoczek II lying north of the intersection of Tysiąclecia Avenue of the Polish State and Sokólska Street.

In 1973, Białostocka Spółdzielnia Mieszkaniowa (BSM) announced a competition for an urban design of the housing estate between the Tysiąclecie Państwa Polskiego Street, the tracks to Kuźnica Białostocka and Sitarska Street. For further work, the project made by "Inwestprojekt" in Poznań by the team A. Łuczkowski (main designer), M. Weigt (designer) and N. Lewandowski (head of the studio) was selected. The first blocks began to be erected at the beginning of 1977. The first buildings were being built at Kozłowa Street. The oldest quarter of the estate is located between Kozłowa and Białostoczek streets (Białostoczek blocks 3,5,7,9 and Kozłowa 26, 30, 32, 34, 36).

== Places of interest ==
- Divine Mercy Sanctuary
- Białystok Power Station (Polish: Elektrociepłownia Białystok)
- The Michał Sopoćko group of schools

== Overview ==
A relic of the former village of Białostoczek is today's Białostoczek Street. It runs along the trail of a country road leading from Białystok towards the forester's lodge on the border of the Wesołowski Forest and the Pietrasze Forest. In turn, Zagumienna Street was marked out at the road behind individual farms.

There are two historic railway lines separating Białostoczek from the surrounding districts. From the south, the district is limited by the route launched in 1886 from Białystok to Baranowicze through Waliły and Wołkowysk. In turn, from the north-west it is the Saint Petersburg–Warsaw Railway, which opened in 1862.

Relics of old buildings have survived in the western part of the estate. At Bielska, Olecka and Suwalska Streets, individual houses were built in the interwar years. Roadside crosses located along Białostoczek Street are other relics of the rural past of the estate.
