= 1989 Polish prison riots =

Series of prison riots and uprisings in Poland

Polish prison riots
- 1989; Part of the post-communist transition
- Recreation of a prison cell from the era of the riots at the Pawiak Prison Museum
- Date: August-December 1989
- Location: Pomerania
- Goals: Amnesty and prison reform

Parties
Prisoners	Polish government Ministry of Justice; Prison complex

Lead figures
Orzech; Mirosław T. Zdzisław P.	Aleksander Bentkowski; Jerzy Stańczyk; Edward Wende; Stanisław Grzywacz

Casualties
- Deaths: 7
- Injuries: 100s
- Result: 1991 prison reforms

The 1989 Polish prison riots refers to an outbreak of violence, which took place at four maximum-security prisons in northwestern Poland in late 1989. The riots were the result of political changes which had taken place in Poland in early and mid-1989, such as the Round Table Agreement, and the subsequent parliamentary election. Inmates in several prisons hoped that the collapse of the communist system would result in the release of repeat offenders, due to an amnesty, but that did not happen. In the riots that ensued, seven people were killed, and hundreds were wounded.

== Background ==
During the rise of Solidarity in 1980 and the ensuing government crackdown, regular and political prisoners in some Polish prisons started to cooperate. By mid-1989, political prisoners in Poland had been released, but prisons across the country were still filled with thousands of inmates sentenced by the communist regime. At that time, prisons in Poland were filled with people found guilty of petty offenses, such as stealing a bicycle. It was the result of the so-called “May 1985 Bill”, which stated that all recidivists, regardless of the crime, had to be sent behind bars. The bill caused overcrowding in cells, and conditions for inmates were very poor.

When, as a result of the 1989 parliamentary election, several former political prisoners found themselves in the Sejm, those who remained behind bars hoped that a general amnesty was imminent.

The first disturbances in prisons began in the late summer of 1989, especially in northwestern Poland (in Nowogard, Czarne, and Goleniow). At first, the inmates demanded improvements in their living conditions and better pay for their work.

The Polish government met the requests of protesting prisoners, who in return demanded more, including the revoking of their sentences and amnesty. In August 1989, inmates at Nowogard took over de facto control of the prison. Their authority went so far that to take any prisoner for a trial at Szczecin court, a permission of the 47-member Protest Committee was needed. The Committee was headed by a 34-year-old prisoner Zbigniew O. (a.k.a.Orzech). Orzech had been in the prison system since he was 18 years old, with less than a year on the outside since then. Originally imprisoned for car theft and resisting arrest, he was involved in prison activism for better prisoner treatment; and had once attempted suicide. By the autumn of 1989, he was only months from being released again.

== Partial amnesty ==
On November 16, 1989, the Sejm declared a partial amnesty, which, however, did not include recidivists. This disappointed thousands of inmates, and two days later Zbigniew O. of the Nowogard prison, together with two other prisoners, Mirosław T. and Zdzisław P., went to Warsaw with a prison guard escort, to talk to Minister of Justice Aleksander Bentkowski. However, in the car, they got into a fight with their escorts, and damaged the vehicle (one version states that the escorts provoked the fight; another that the inmates got drunk and started it themselves); either way the minister refused to meet them.

Nevertheless, Orzech managed to talk to Senator Edward Wende of the opposition Solidarity Citizens' Committee. Wende did not have good news for him and other inmates, telling the prisoners' representative that the Contract Sejm would most likely refuse an extended amnesty. After returning to Nowogard, Orzech told other inmates that if there was no extended amnesty, the prison “would be destroyed”. Corrections officers and managers of prisons in northwestern Poland were aware of the situation, and brought reinforcements from other parts of the country.

On 7 December 1989, the Polish Parliament debated about final shape of the amnesty. Inmates of several northwestern prisons (Goleniow, Czarne, Nowogard) anxiously awaited the news from Warsaw.

== Riots ==
When Teleexpress and Polish Radio informed that the amnesty did not include recidivists, furious prisoners began fighting the wardens. In Goleniow and Czarne riots have broken out, with an unknown number of victims (later on it turned out that in Czarne, 6 people died, and 30 were wounded. In Goleniow, a prisoner accused of cooperation with authorities was set on fire and died, while in Czarne, wardens opened fire on inmates who tried to take control of the gate.

In Nowogard, the prison wardens prevented the prisoners from watching the prison's television, but they got the information from their own, clandestine radio sets. Orzech demanded to talk to the warden. During the conversation, he threatened to blow up prison’s furnace room, which was serviced by the inmates. The manager, Stanisław Grzywacz, gave up and agreed to Orzech’s demand to organize a meeting of prisoners. At the same time, Grzywacz ordered all prisoners out of the furnace room and replaced them with wardens. During the prisoner meeting, those present discussed two options of active and passive resistance. Around 40%, including Orzech, supported an active riot, and it was decided to follow the majority who favored passive resistance. The inmantes would refuse to go out for their everyday walks, and every hour, they would make noise, hitting their pots against bars in windows.

On the next day, 8 December, Nowogard inmates listened to the morning news on the radio, finding out that riots had broken in other prisons. When the news was brought to Orzech, he immediately went to see manager Grzywacz, telling him: “In five minutes, we will burn your prison to the ground”. Soon afterwards, Orzech, while returning to his cell, threw a chair at a window, breaking it and yelling: “We are going down”, which was understood as a call for action.

Within a few minutes, the whole prison descended into chaos. Wardens ran away in panic, locking all doors and gates behind. The heaviest skirmishes took place in Pavilion IV, where Orzech was held. It was him, who, according to many witnesses, gave the order to set fire to the buildings, and also to evacuate the sick prisoners from the hospital located there. On 10 December, riots took place on an even larger scale. Inmates threw bricks and burning rags, while wardens used tear gas. Then the prisoners got to the cafeteria, from where they took several hundred jars of goulash and bars of chocolate. On the same day, a unit of ZOMO arrived at prison gate, under Jerzy Stańczyk, who would later become chief of Polish police (1995–1997). Stanczyk and “Orzech” met each other at the gate of the prison. The meeting was short, as Stanczyk pointed to a row of armed ZOMO agents, and threatened the use of military and firearms. In response, “Orzech” nodded and left; the prisoners soon surrendered.

A few hours after the meeting, ZOMO entered the prison, beating many inmates, but not Orzech. In the following months, most active inmates were transferred to prisons across Poland, and at the District Court in Szczecin, a trial of three leaders of riot took place, during which some 100 witnesses gave their testimonies. There were attempts to intimidate witnesses giving testimonies against Orzech and others. On 22 November 1991, Orzech was found guilty of inciting riots and destruction of public property. He was sentenced to 7 years, and a fine (in 2007, recalculated as a result of a civil suit to 35 million zlotys ). Miroslaw T. was sentenced to 5 years, and Zdzislaw P. - 4 years. Orzech would spend most of his life since then in prison.

== Aftermath and legacy ==
The Polish penal system was reformed in 1991, which resulted in further improvements to the quality of life in prisons. A 2020 article in Do Rzeczy labelled the prison riot as the first massacre of the Third Republic.

In 2014 a documentary directed by Małgorzata Kozera, titled Był Bunt, about the riots was jointly produced by Al Jazeera and Telewizja Polska. A fictional serialisation of the events around the riots was commissioned by Netflix with a release date set for 2026. Directed by Mateusz Rakowicz and Marek Lechki, and starrring Filip Pławiak, Jacek Poniedziałek, and Borys Szyc, the series focuses on the prison in Czarne.
