= Tunel Wielki =

Cave in Poland with archaeological finds

- Location within Lesser Poland Voivodeship
- Location: near Sąspów, Kraków County, Lesser Poland Voivodeship, Poland
- Coordinates: 50°13′20″N 19°47′41″E
- Length: 24 m (79 ft)
- Elevation: 440 m (1,440 ft)
- Access: Unavailable/Not-permitted

Tunel Wielki (literally "Big Tunnel") is a cave in Ojców National Park, Poland. It is an archaeological site, located in the karst area of Kraków-Częstochowa Upland, about 20 km north of Kraków.

The 1967–1968 excavations identified 15 layers in 4.5-metre-deep (15 ft) sediments in five distinct series coming from early Würm stage and early prehistorical cultures—Lengyel culture, Corded Ware culture, Funnelbeaker culture, Lusatian culture—as well as from the Middle Ages to 19th century.

In 2016 excavations were repeated to verify and confirm the previous finds and conclusions.

Initially it was concluded that the oldest human presence in the cave dates back about 40,000 years. However more recent inspections of the finds dated the oldest tools to about 450,000–550,000 BP, suggesting Homo heidelbergensis as tool owners, which would indicate the oldest human species found in Poland.
