= Płock Castle =

Gothic castle in Masovian Voivodeship, Poland

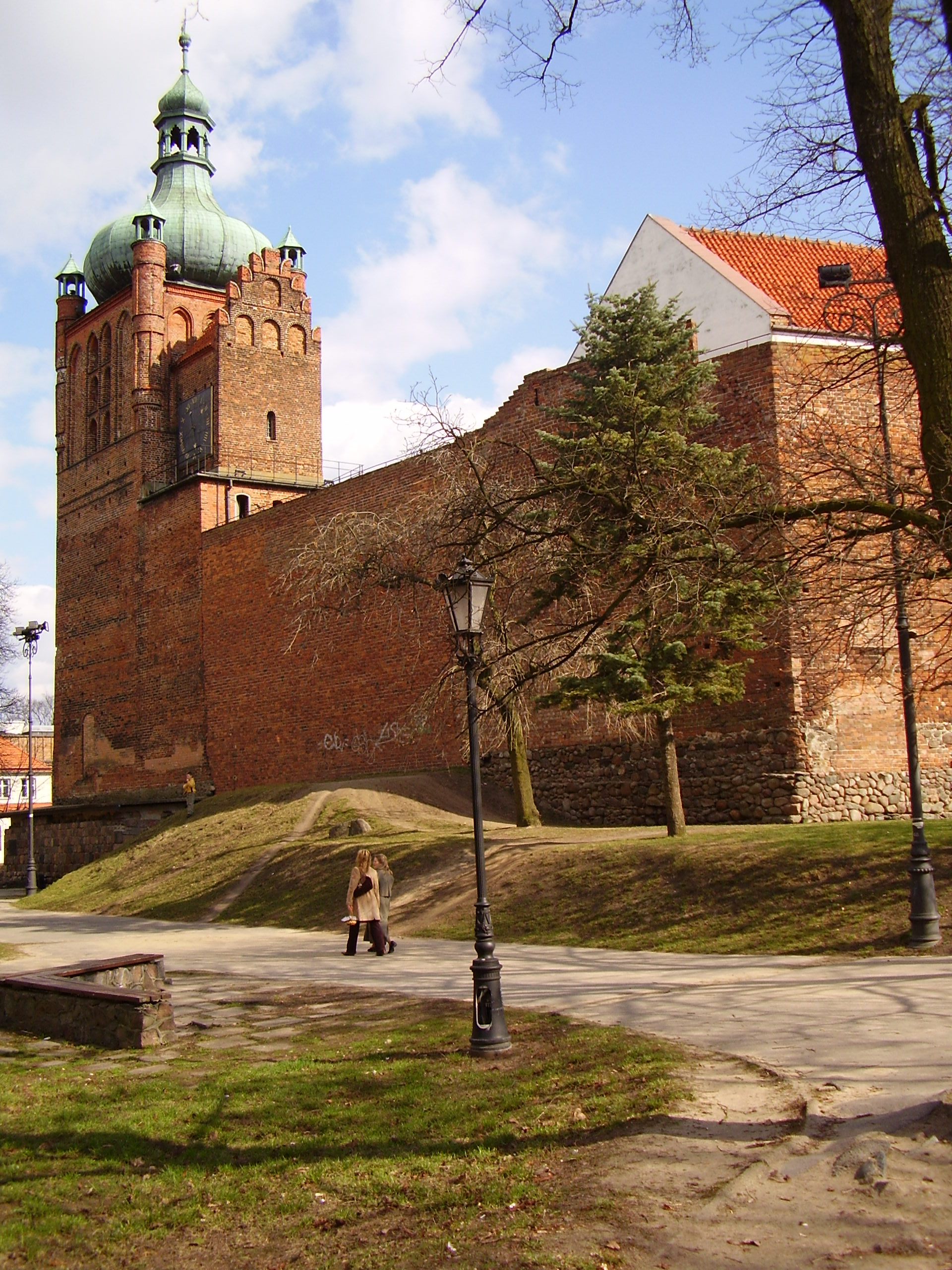
- Clock tower during the reign of Casimir III the Great

- Location of the Castle of the Masovian Dukes in Poland
- 52°32′29″N 19°41′17″E
- Location: Płock, Masovian Voivodeship, Poland

History
- Built: 1351

Site notes
- Architectural style: Gothic

The Castle of the Masovian Dukes in Płock is a Gothic castle built under the reign of Casimir III the Great, becoming a stronghold of the Dukes of Masovia until the fifteenth century. The castle is located in the Princely Capital City of Płock, Masovian Voivodeship; in Poland.

== History ==
The castle is located on a steep Vistulan hillside, most likely since the eleventh century, a wooden fortress - defended by walls and dikes, where in the middle there was a small stone built stronghold. On the turning point of the eleventh and twelfth century, when one of the largest Masovian strongholds where already located on the hillside - a chapel and wall-defended living quarters were built in 1194.

At the end of the thirteenth century, the raising of the castle had begun, when the stronghold was fortified, and took on its current form under the reign of Casimir III the Great. The expansion of the castle was done on the hillside of the former stronghold, which was reconstructed with bricks and expanded, the stronghold was also raised with two towers. The castle was built in square-shaped complex. In the south-west of the complex, the Szlachecka Tower was raised - with a squared base and lower half; and an octagonal upper half. In the northern part of the castle, by a Romanesque building, there is a clock tower. The castle's courtyard is closed off by the north-western, eastern and southern wing. The castle is fortified by a double encirclement of defensive walls - securing the stronghold and Płock, being just outside the castle's walls.

The castle was a residence of the Masovian Dukes up until the fifteenth century. Due to a partial removal of the hillside, in 1532, the castle suffered damage, which was rebuilt. In 1538, the Masovian dukes had resided in the newly built palace, outside the castle walls, allowing the castle complex to be given to the Benedictines. During the times of the wars against the Swedes, the castle was severely damaged, first in 1657, and then in 1705. After the castle's reconstruction, the castle complex became a Baroque architectural style Benedictine Abbey, which existed until 1781. When after the Partitions of Poland, Prussia took over the castle, the authorities ordered some of the defensive walls to be deconstructed. From 1865, the castle hosted spiritual seminars.

After World War II, the castle was renovated, and since 1973, the castle houses a museum.
