= Divine Mercy Sanctuary (Płock) =

Roman Catholic chapel

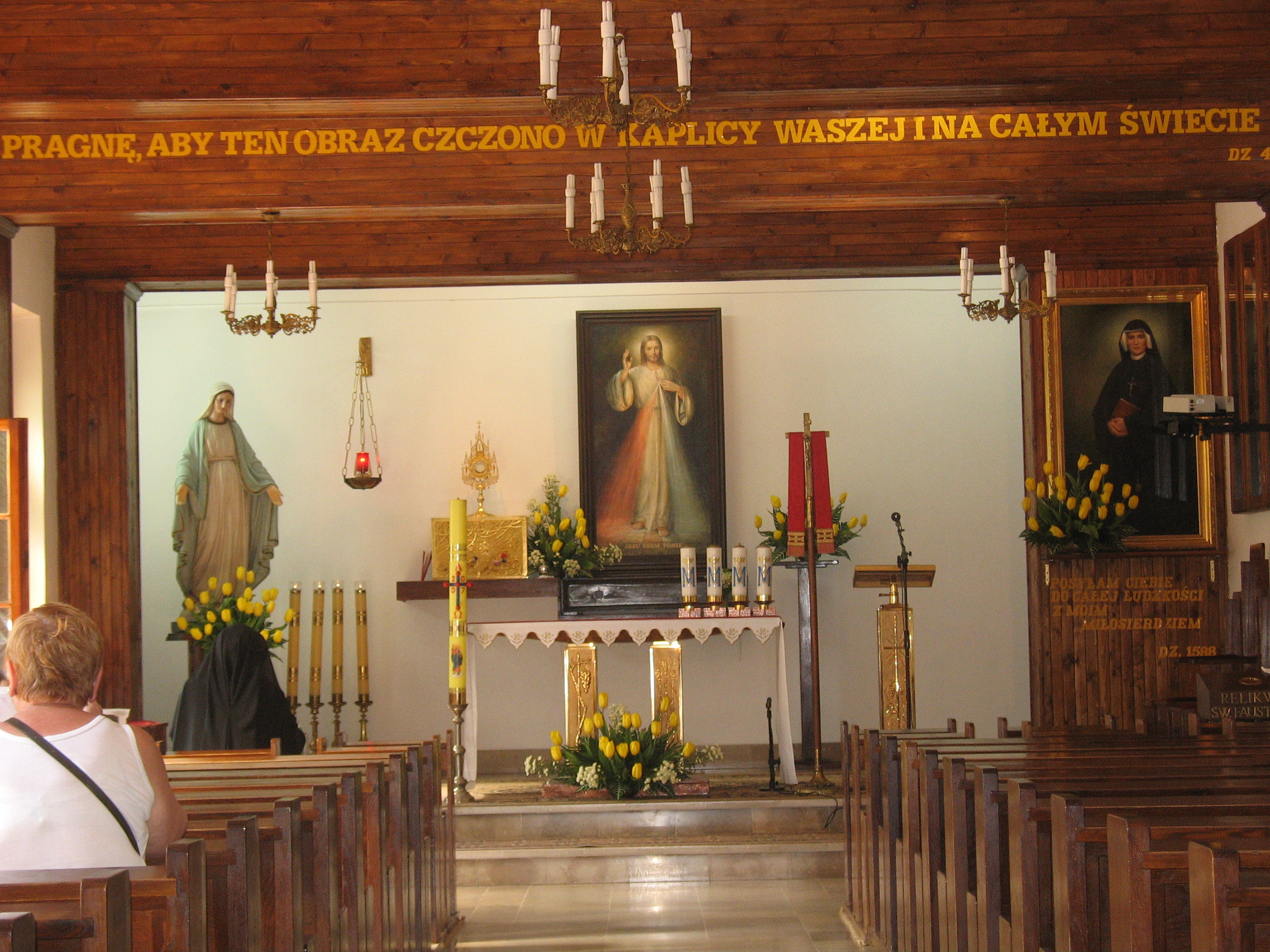
Interior view of the chapel

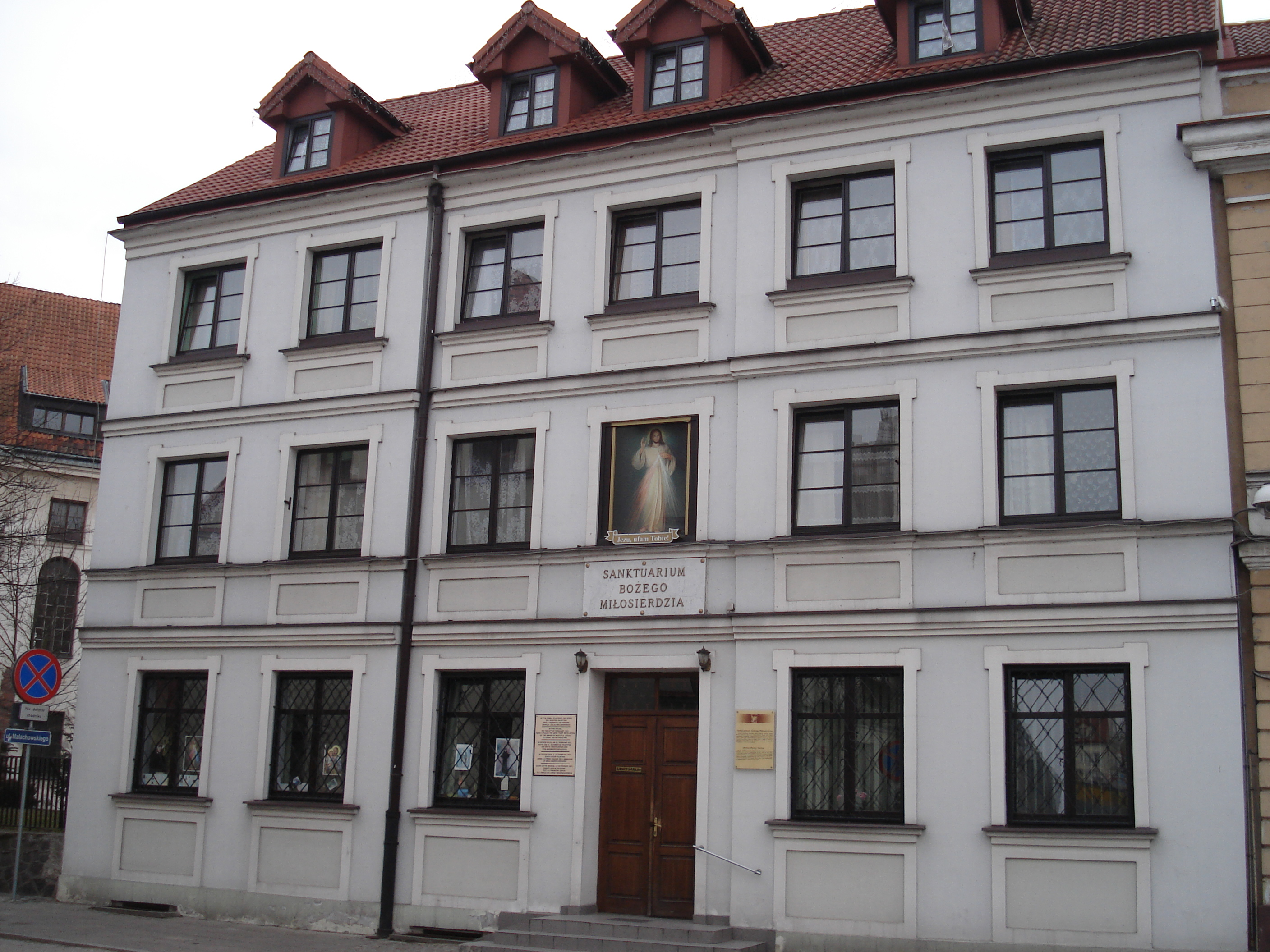
Exterior view

The Divine Mercy Sanctuary is a Roman Catholic chapel, in Poland, dedicated to the Divine Mercy devotion, originated by Faustina Kowalska.

== Description ==
The chapel belongs to Zgromadzenie Sióstr Matki Bożej Miłosierdzia (the Congregation of the Sisters of Our Lady of Mercy). This is where Kowalska reported her first vision of the Divine Mercy image. According to Kowalska, Jesus said to her: Paint an image according to the pattern you see, with the signature: Jesus, I trust in You. I desire that this image be venerated, first in your chapel, and then throughout the world. I promise that the soul that will venerate this image will not perish. (Diary 47–48).

The chapel is located at the Old Market Square in Płock. In 2009 the expansion of the sanctuary to a larger church begun.

== See also ==
- Chaplet of the Divine Mercy
- Divine Mercy Sunday
- Divine Mercy Sanctuary (Kraków)
- Divine Mercy Sanctuary (Vilnius)
