= Anna Kochanowska =

Polish radio journalist, literary director, and politician (1922–2019)

- fair use image only
- Born: 17 May 1922; Płock
- Died: 31 May 2019 (aged 97); Olsztyn
- Occupations: Radio journalist and politician

Anna Kochanowska (17 May 1922 – 31 May 2019) was a Polish radio journalist, literary director and politician. She was a representative on the Seym of the sixth and seventh term of the Polish People's Republic.

== Life ==
Kochanowska was born in Płock in 1922. Her educated parents were Cecylia and Zygmunt Maciejowski and the family moved to Lodz in 1938. Two years later they were in Warsaw.

She studied at the Film and Theatre schools as well as the Academy of Fine Art before working in Warsaw for the Central Board of Theatres in 1951. She was known as the literary director and she looked after the theaters in Olsztyn, Grudziądz and Białystok. It was in Białystok that she first got a job in radio. At that radio station she got to read her own novel, Czerwony rogatywka to listeners. She had become a radio journalist.

She moved on to be an editor at the radio in Szczecin before joining station in Olsztyn in 1956.

She later became a politician. She was a representative on the Seym of the sixth and seventh term of the Polish People's Republic before the end of communism is the country.

Kochanowska died in 2019 in Olsztyn.
