= Płock =

City in Masovian Voivodeship, Poland

- City county
- Ducal Capital City of Płock; Polish: Stołeczne Książęce Miasto Płock
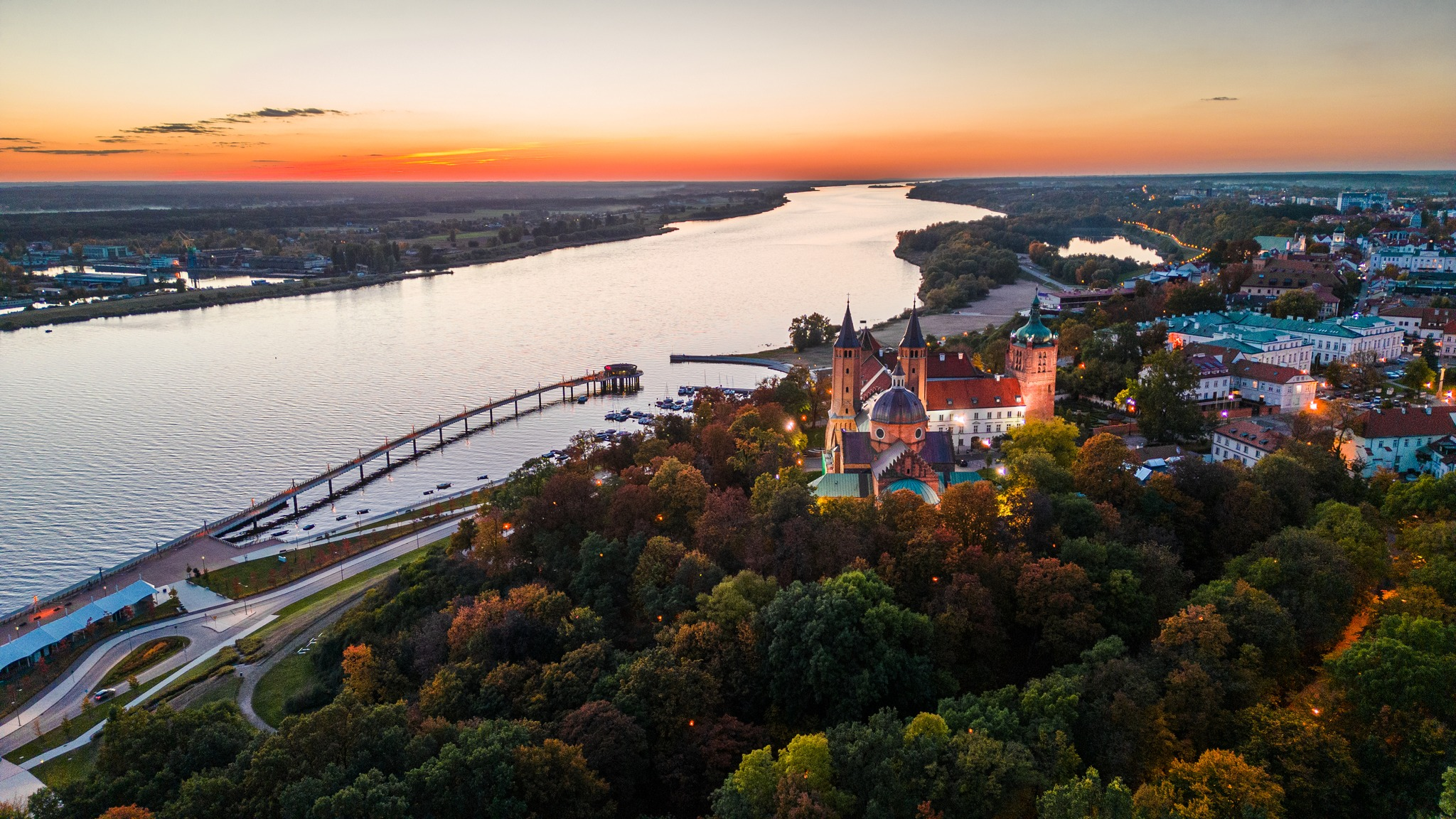
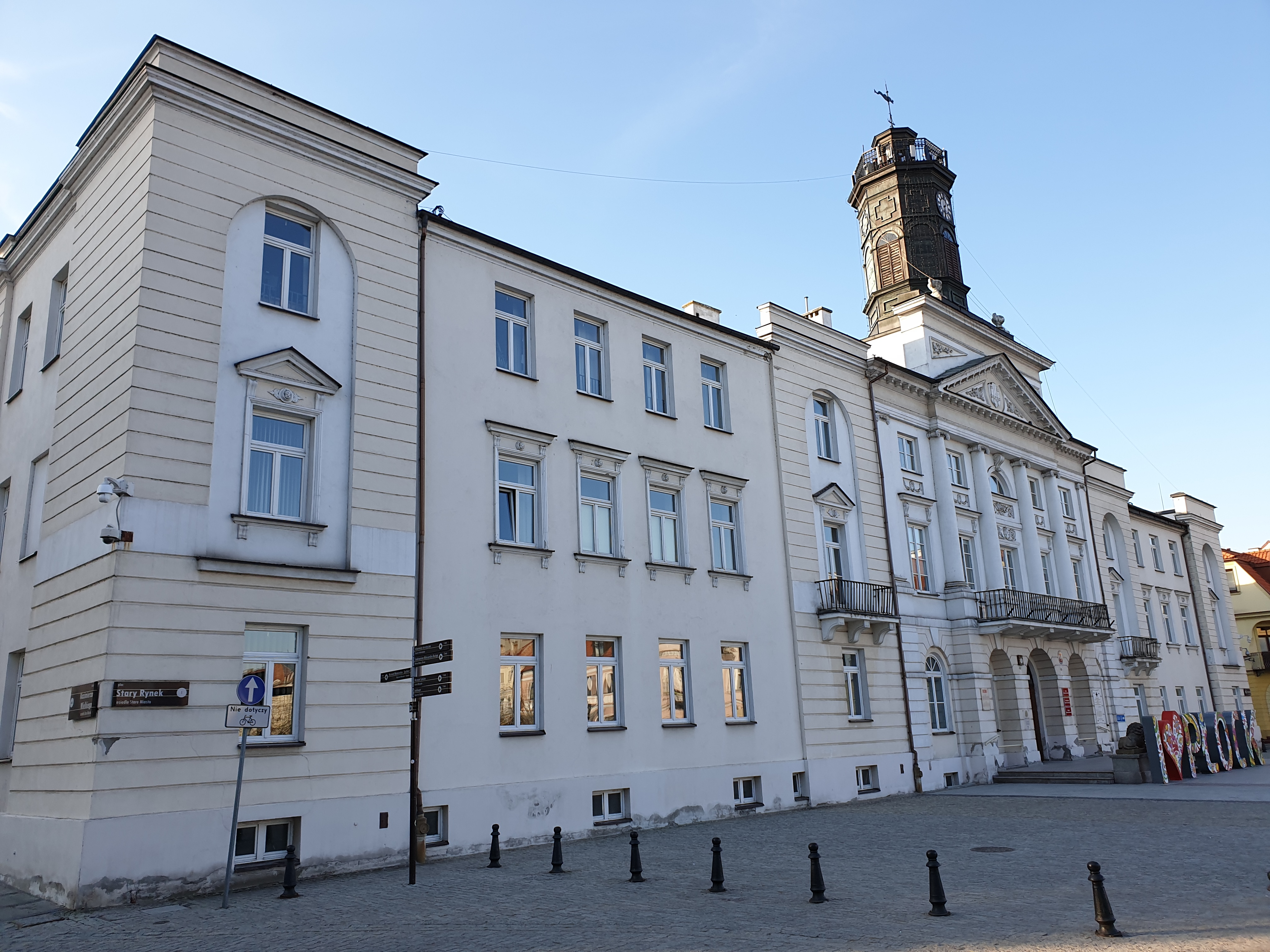
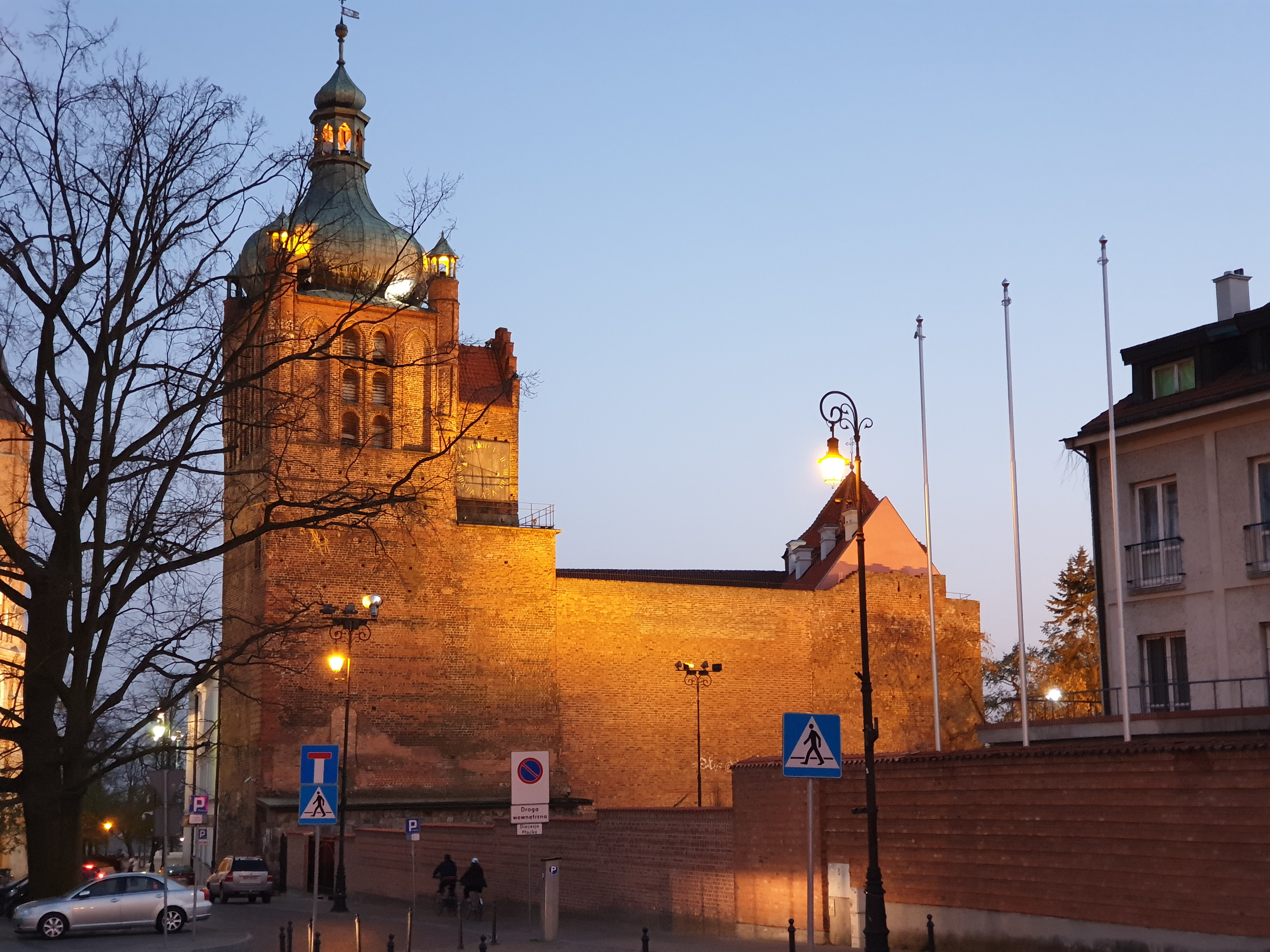
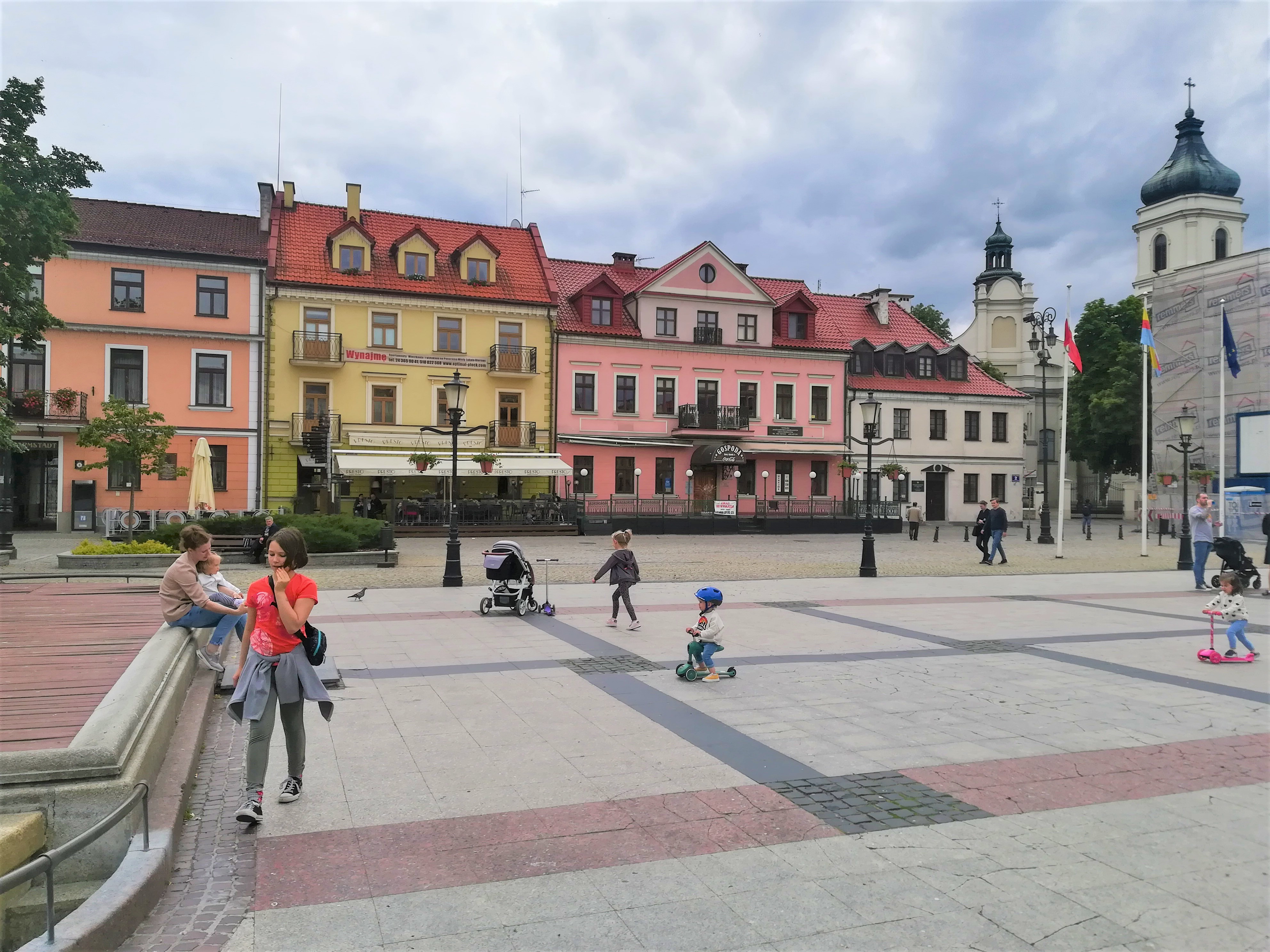
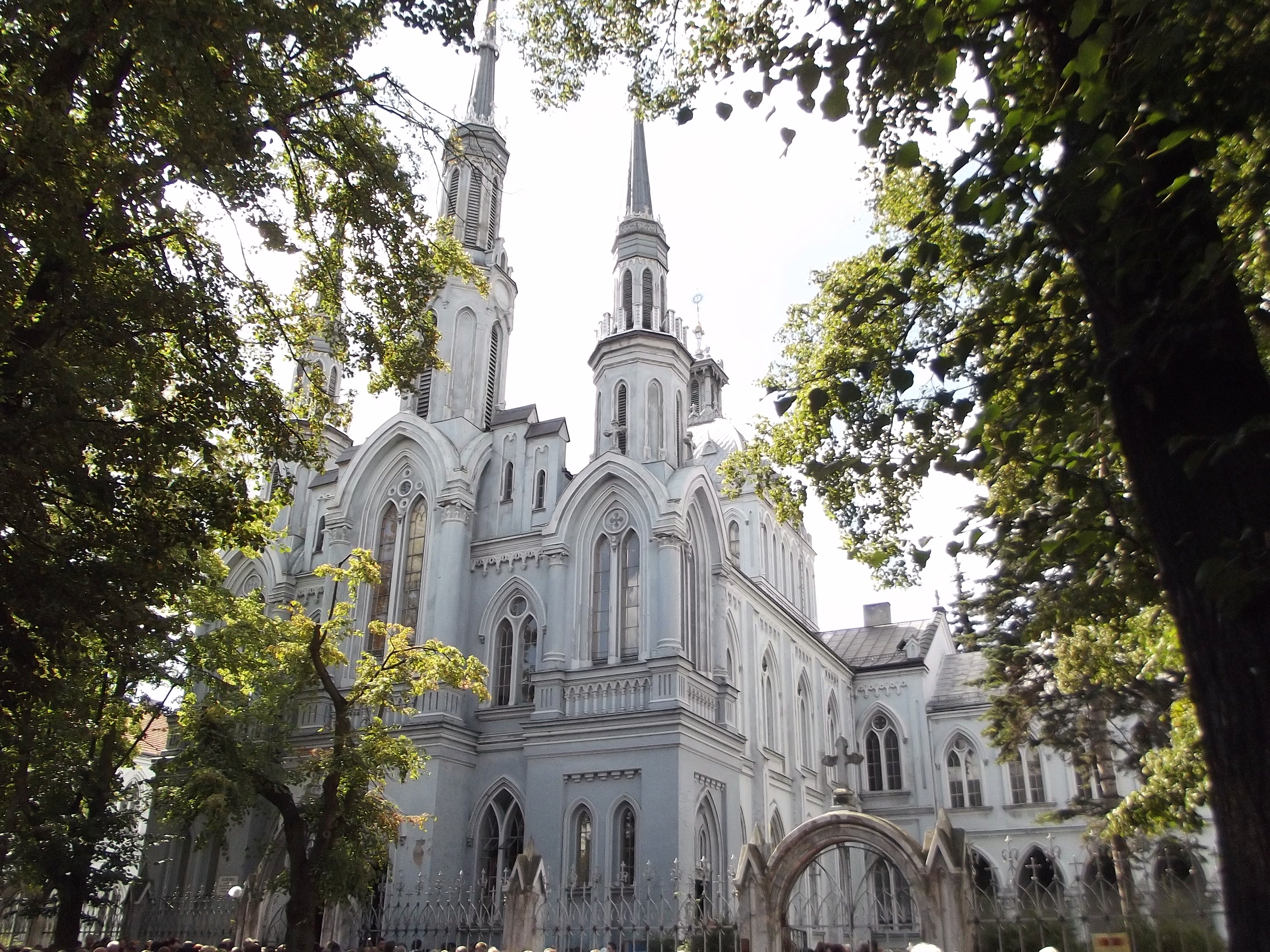
- Aerial view; River Vistula and Płock Cathedral Town Hall Płock Castle Market Square Mariavite Cathedral

- Flag Coat of arms
- Motto: Virtute et labore augere
- Location within Poland
- Coordinates: 52°33′N 19°42′E
- Country: Poland
- Voivodeship: Masovian
- County: city county
- Established: 10th century
- City rights: 1237

Government
  - City mayor: Andrzej Nowakowski

Area
  - Total: 88.06 km^{2} (34.00 sq mi)
- Elevation: 60 m (200 ft)

Population (31 December 2021)
  - Total: 116,962 ▼ (32nd)
  - Density: 1,328/km^{2} (3,440/sq mi)
- Time zone: UTC+1 (CET)
  - Summer (DST): UTC+2 (CEST)
- Postal code: 09-400 to 09-411, 09-419 to 09-421
- Area code: +48 24
- Car plates: WP
- Website: Płock City Hall

Płock (pronounced [pwɔt͡sk]), officially the Ducal Capital City of Płock, is a city in central Poland, on the Vistula river, in the Masovian Voivodeship. According to the data provided by GUS on 31 December 2021, there were 116,962 inhabitants in the city.

Płock is a seat of the county (powiat) in the west of the Masovian Voivodeship. From 1079 to 1138 it was the capital of Poland. The Cathedral Hill (Wzgórze Tumskie), along with Płock Castle and the Catholic Cathedral containing the sarcophagi of some Polish monarchs, is listed as a Historic Monument of Poland. It was the main city and administrative center of Mazovia in the Middle Ages before the rise of Warsaw, and later it remained a royal city of Poland. It is the cultural, academic, scientific, administrative and transportation center of the west and north Masovian region. Płock is the seat of the Roman Catholic Diocese of Płock, one of the oldest dioceses in the country, founded in the 11th century, and it is also the global headquarters for the Mariavite Church. Poland's oldest school and largest oil refinery are located in Płock.

== History ==
=== Middle Ages ===
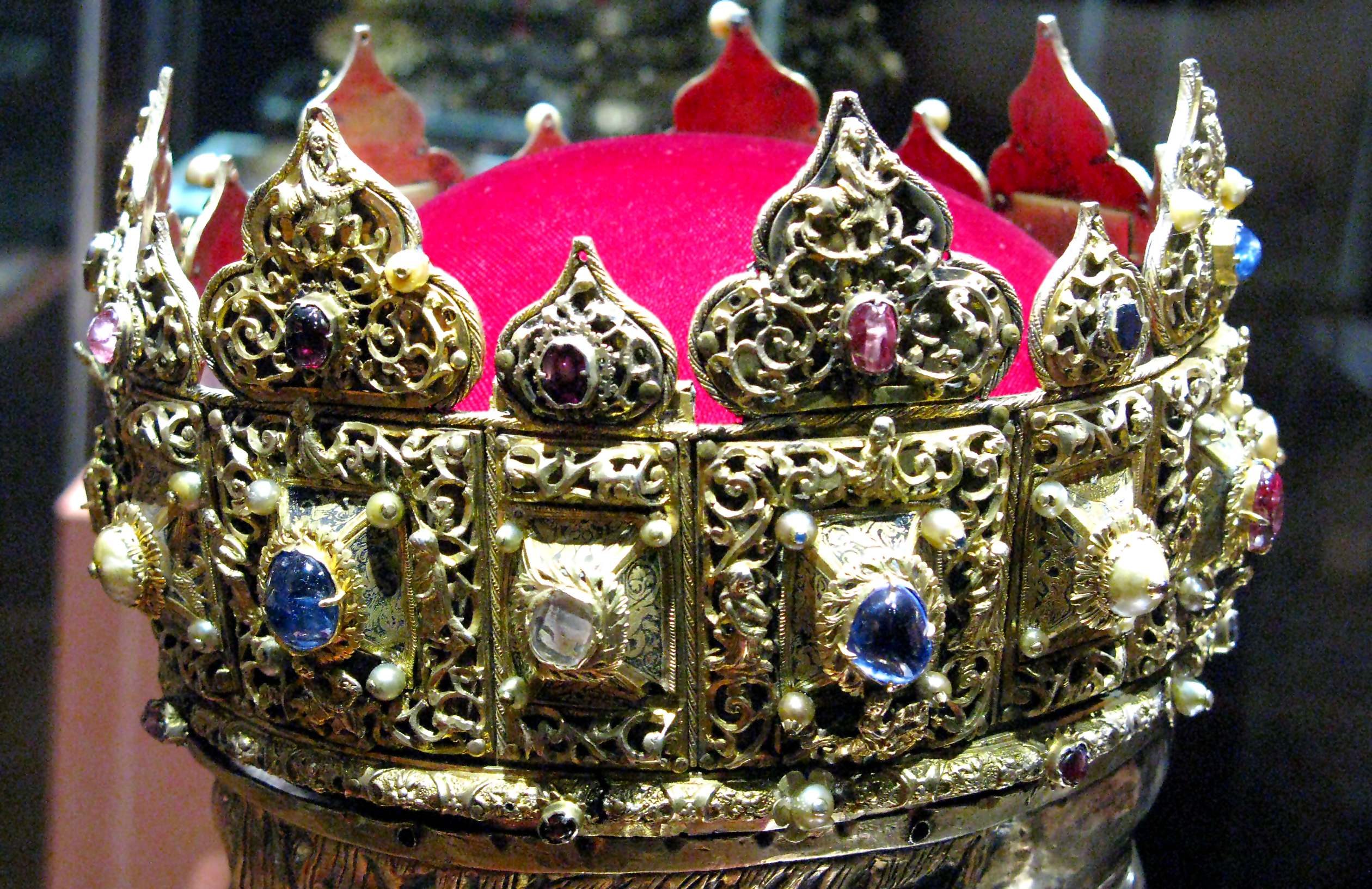
Płock Diadem, 13th century

The area was long inhabited by pagan peoples. In the 10th century, a fortified location was established high of the Vistula River's bank. This location was at a junction of shipping and trade routes and was strategic for centuries. Its location was a great asset. In 1009 a Benedictine monastery was established here. It became a center of science and art for the area.

During the rule of the first monarchs of the Piast dynasty, even prior to the Baptism of Poland, Płock served as one of the monarchial seats, including that of Duke Mieszko I and King Bolesław I the Brave. The king built the original fortifications on Cathedral Hill (Polish: Wzgórze Tumskie), overlooking the Vistula River. From 1037 to 1047, Płock was capital of the independent Mazovian state of Miecław. Płock has been the residence of many Mazovian dukes. In 1075, a diocese seat was created here for the Roman Catholic church. From 1079 to 1138, during the reign of the Polish monarchs Władysław I Herman and Bolesław III Wrymouth, the city was the capital of Poland, then earning its title as the Ducal Capital City of Płock (Polish: Stołeczne Książęce Miasto Płock). As a result of the fragmentation of Poland into smaller duchies, from 1138 it was the capital of the Duchy of Masovia, and afterwards the Duchy of Płock. In 1180 the present-day Marshal Stanisław Małachowski High School (Małachowianka), the oldest still existing school in Poland and one of the oldest in Central Europe, was established. Among its notable graduates is scholar and jurist Paweł Włodkowic, a precursor of religious freedom in Europe, who studied there in the late 14th century.

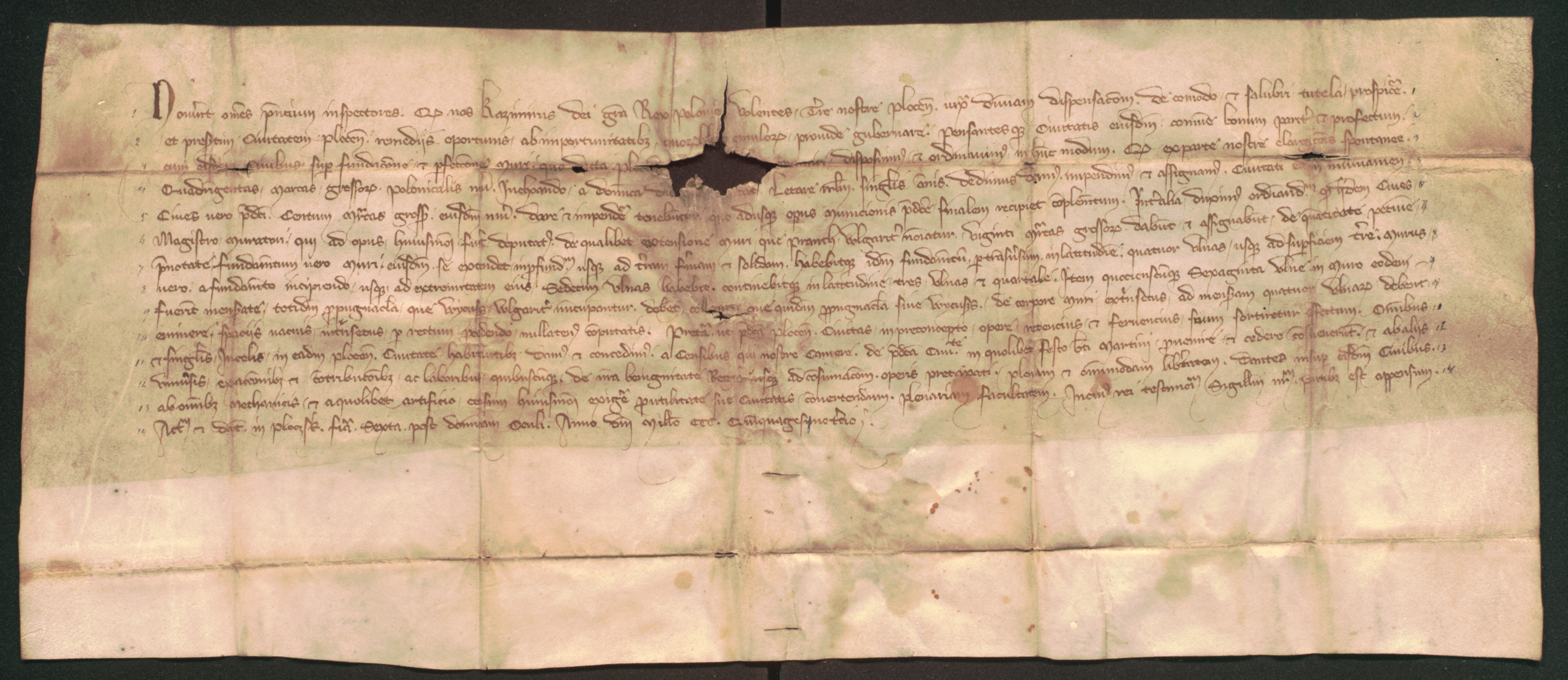
Privilege of King Casimir III the Great from 1353 created a fund for the construction of defensive walls.

In 1237 Płock was officially granted town rights, renewed in 1255. Płock was located on a trade route connecting Toruń with Warsaw, Lublin, Chełm and Włodzimierz. In the 14th century King Casimir III the Great vested Płock with vast privileges. The first Jewish immigrants came to the city in the 14th century, responding to the extension of rights by the Polish kings. In 1495 the Duchy of Płock was integrated directly with the Polish Crown as a reverted fief.

=== Modern era ===
Expanded representational coat of arms of Płock

In the early modern period, Płock was a royal city of Poland and capital of the Płock Voivodeship within the larger Greater Poland Province. The 16th century was the golden age of the city, before it suffered major losses in population due to plague, fire, and horrific warfare, with wars between Sweden and Poland in the late 17th and early 18th centuries.

In the 17th century, the Swedes destroyed much of the city, but the people rebuilt and recovered. In the late 18th century, it took down the old city walls, and made a New Town, and after Germans of Prussia partitioned Poland Second Partition of Poland, they filled Płock with many German migrants.

In the Second Partition of Poland in 1793 the city was annexed by Prussia. The Polish 4th and 5th Infantry Regiments were formed in Płock in 1806. From 1807 it was part of the short-lived Polish Duchy of Warsaw, within which it was the capital of the Płock Department. In 1815 it became part of Congress Poland, later on fully annexed by the Russian Empire. The Polish 3rd Rifle Regiment, which later fought against Russia in the November Uprising, was stationed in Płock. In 1827 Fryderyk Chopin visited Płock. In 1831, the last sejm of Congress Poland was held in the Płock Town Hall. It was a seat of provincial government and an active center; its economy was closely tied to major grain trade. It laid out a new city plan in the early 19th century, as new residents continued to arrive. Many of its finest buildings were constructed in this period in the Neoclassical style. In 1820 the Płock Scientific Society was founded, and in the late 19th century the city began to industrialize. In 1863 local Poles fought in the January Uprising against Russia. The leader of the uprising in the Płock region, Zygmunt Padlewski, was executed by the Russians in Płock in May 1863. In 1905, large demonstrations of Polish youth and workers took place in Płock.

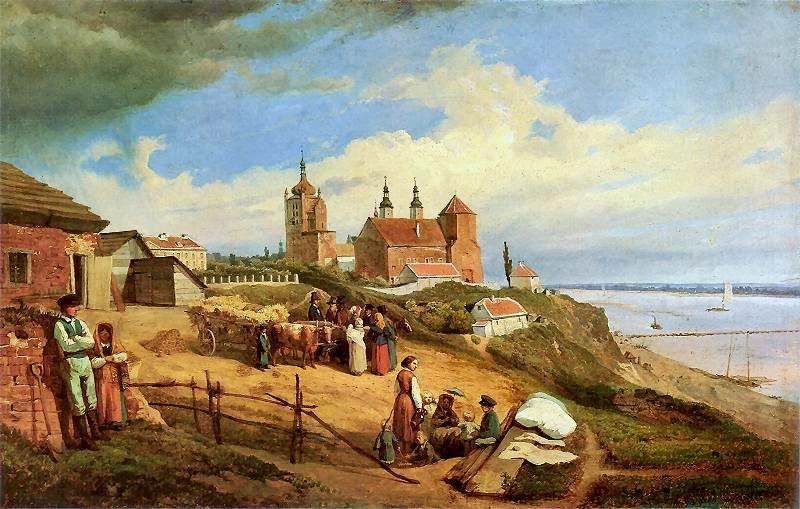
Płock in 1852, by Wojciech Gerson

During World War I, Płock was occupied by Germany from 1915 to 1918, and in 1918 Poland regained independence, and Płock was immediately reintegrated with Poland. In August 1920, the city became famous for its successful heroic defense against the Soviets during the Polish–Soviet War. 250 Polish defenders, including 100 civilians, were killed in the battle. In 1921, Marshal Józef Piłsudski visited Płock and awarded the city with the Cross of Valour, making Płock the second Polish city to be awarded with a Polish military decoration (shortly after Lwów).

=== World War II ===
When Germany invaded Poland in September 1939, the city of Płock was annexed into the Reich as part of the Regierungsbezirk Zichenau. The Germans renamed the city Schröttersburg on 21 May 1941 after the former Prussian Baron of the Empire Friedrich Leopold von Schrötter.

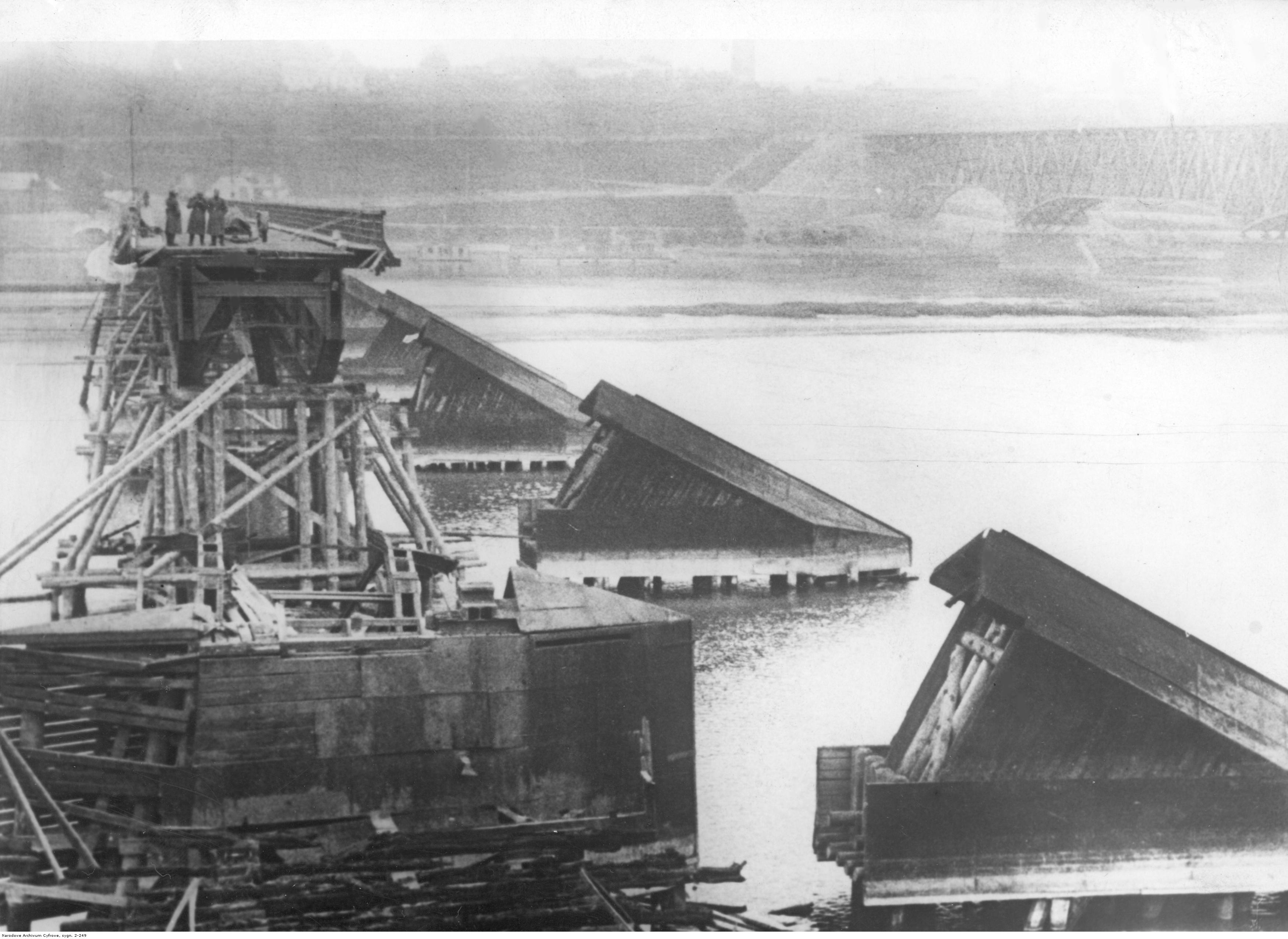
The bridge at Płock, destroyed by retreating Polish forces during the invasion of Poland in September 1939

As part of the Intelligenzaktion, Germans carried out mass arrests of Poles, who were then imprisoned in the local prison, and around 200 of whom were murdered in large massacres in Łąck between October 1939 and February 1940. Among the victims were Polish teachers, activists, shopowners, notaries, local officials, pharmacists, directors and members of the Polish Military Organisation. Next mass arrests of about 2,000 Poles from Płock and the Płock County were carried out in April 1940, and in June 1940, another 200 Poles from various settlements in the region were imprisoned in the local prison. Some prisoners were then deported and murdered in the Soldau concentration camp, and some teachers from Płock were among Polish teachers murdered in the Mauthausen concentration camp. In 1940, Germans murdered 80 elderly and disabled people from Płock in the nearby village of Brwilno. The Archbishop of Płock Antoni Julian Nowowiejski and the auxiliary Bishop Leon Wetmański were imprisoned in the nearby village of Słupno, and then in 1941 also murdered in the Soldau concentration camp, where also many other local priests were killed. Nowowiejski and Wetmański are now considered two of the 108 Blessed Polish Martyrs of World War II by the Catholic Church. Poles were also subjected to expulsions, 1,300 Poles were expelled in November and December 1939, and over 4,000 also in February and March 1941. Nazi Germany also subjected the inhabitants to forced labour. Even 10 to 14-year-old children were used for forced labour in the city and its environs, whereas older ones were deported to forced labour in Germany. The Germans also established and operated two forced labour subcamps of the local prison, and an additional forced labour "education" camp in the city. In the winter of 1942–1943, a freight train with kidnapped Polish children arrived to the Płock-Radziwie station, and around 300 of the children froze to death and were buried by the Germans in the forests of nearby Łąck. Since 1943, the local Sicherheitspolizei carried out deportations of Poles including teenage boys to the Stutthof concentration camp.

Historical population
Year	Pop.	±%
1950	33,128	—
1960	42,798	+29.2%
1970	71,900	+68.0%
1978	96,709	+34.5%
1988	122,660	+26.8%
2002	128,361	+4.6%
2011	124,553	−3.0%
2021	114,594	−8.0%

At the same time, the Nazis were also brutalizing the Jewish population of Płock. They conscripted them for forced labor and established a Jewish ghetto in Płock in 1940. In that ghetto, up to ten people shared each room. Medical supplies were inadequate and diseases spread. Germans murdered many Jews in Płock but most were deported to other areas and then on to be murdered in Treblinka. By the war's end, only 300 Jewish residents were known to have survived, of more than 10,000 in the region (for more information see Jewish history below). Some Poles in Płock tried to assist their Jewish neighbors by smuggling food to them and sneaking food to them when they were rounded up and had to stand in the street for an entire day on a bitterly cold day waiting to be deported.

Germans closed Polish institutions, schools and the Polish press, and looted or destroyed numerous Polish cultural monuments, collections and archives, including the rich collection of the Płock Scientific Society. The collections of local museums, the cathedral's ancient treasury, church archives and the diocesan library were stolen and taken to museums in Königsberg, Wrocław and Berlin. The local seminary was converted by the Germans into barracks of the SS.

Despite such circumstances, the city remained the center of the Polish underground resistance movement. Secret Polish schooling was organized. In September 1942, the Germans publicly hanged 13 Polish resistance members in the Old Town. On 19 January 1945, the Gestapo carried out a massacre of 79 Poles, who were either shot or burned alive. The city was restored to Poland, although with a Soviet-installed communist regime, which remained in power until the Fall of Communism in the 1980s.

=== Recent history ===
In 1975–1998, Płock was the capital of the Płock Voivodeship. In 1976, Płock was one of the centers of large anti-communist protests.

== Climate ==
Płock has an oceanic climate (Köppen climate classification: Cfb) using the −3 °C (27 °F) isotherm or a humid continental climate (Köppen climate classification: Dfb) using the 0 °C (32 °F) isotherm.

Climate data for Płock (1991–2020 normals, extremes 1951–present)
Month	Jan	Feb	Mar	Apr	May	Jun	Jul	Aug	Sep	Oct	Nov	Dec	Year
Record high °C (°F)	12.7 (54.9)	16.5 (61.7)	23.8 (74.8)	30.3 (86.5)	32.1 (89.8)	34.3 (93.7)	36.6 (97.9)	37.3 (99.1)	35.5 (95.9)	26.7 (80.1)	19.5 (67.1)	15.4 (59.7)	37.3 (99.1)
Mean daily maximum °C (°F)	0.9 (33.6)	2.5 (36.5)	7.1 (44.8)	14.1 (57.4)	19.2 (66.6)	22.3 (72.1)	24.7 (76.5)	24.6 (76.3)	19.0 (66.2)	12.7 (54.9)	6.3 (43.3)	2.3 (36.1)	13.0 (55.4)
Daily mean °C (°F)	−1.4 (29.5)	−0.4 (31.3)	3.1 (37.6)	8.8 (47.8)	13.7 (56.7)	16.9 (62.4)	19.0 (66.2)	18.8 (65.8)	13.9 (57.0)	8.7 (47.7)	3.9 (39.0)	0.1 (32.2)	8.8 (47.8)
Mean daily minimum °C (°F)	−3.8 (25.2)	−3.0 (26.6)	−0.3 (31.5)	3.9 (39.0)	8.4 (47.1)	11.6 (52.9)	13.6 (56.5)	13.5 (56.3)	9.5 (49.1)	5.4 (41.7)	1.6 (34.9)	−2.2 (28.0)	4.9 (40.8)
Record low °C (°F)	−35.6 (−32.1)	−27.7 (−17.9)	−23.7 (−10.7)	−6.2 (20.8)	−4.0 (24.8)	0.3 (32.5)	4.2 (39.6)	3.9 (39.0)	−2.2 (28.0)	−7.5 (18.5)	−20.2 (−4.4)	−23.9 (−11.0)	−35.6 (−32.1)
Average precipitation mm (inches)	30.4 (1.20)	26.2 (1.03)	30.6 (1.20)	31.6 (1.24)	50.8 (2.00)	48.2 (1.90)	40.5 (1.59)	42.9 (1.69)	47.3 (1.86)	35.0 (1.38)	33.7 (1.33)	33.4 (1.31)	450.7 (17.74)
Average extreme snow depth cm (inches)	6.3 (2.5)	5.9 (2.3)	3.9 (1.5)	1.0 (0.4)	0.0 (0.0)	0.0 (0.0)	0.0 (0.0)	0.0 (0.0)	0.0 (0.0)	0.3 (0.1)	1.7 (0.7)	3.7 (1.5)	6.3 (2.5)
Average precipitation days (≥ 0.1 mm)	15.62	13.77	13.20	11.40	12.37	12.40	13.13	12.30	11.50	12.80	14.60	15.90	158.99
Average snowy days (≥ 0 cm)	15.3	14.1	6.8	0.5	0.0	0.0	0.0	0.0	0.0	0.2	3.4	11.8	52.1
Average relative humidity (%)	86.7	83.5	77.4	69.2	70.0	71.7	72.0	70.9	77.6	83.1	88.5	88.4	78.3
Mean monthly sunshine hours	48.9	68.8	132.3	203.8	254.8	256.9	257.9	247.0	166.5	111.2	47.3	36.4	1,831.7
Source 1: Institute of Meteorology and Water Management
Source 2: Meteomodel.pl (records, relative humidity 1991–2020)

== Culture ==
=== Architecture ===
Main sights include:

- Płock Cathedral - originally built in the Romanesque style, dates back to the 12th century, reconstructed in 16th century
- Płock Castle, built in 14th century, today housing the diocesan museum with the collection of medieval goldsmiths' works
- Saint Dominic Church - former Dominican church, built in 13th century and remodelled in 16th century
- Saint Bartholomew Church - built in the 14th century, rebuilt in Baroque style in 18th century
- Small Synagogue - built 1810-1822
- Płock Town Hall, built 1824-1827 in the classicist style
- Temple of Mercy and Charity - Mariavite cathedral, built 1911-1914 in English Neo-Gothic style
- Museum of Mazovia - housed in Art Nouveau tenement house
- Dom Turysty - modernist hotel built 1959-1962
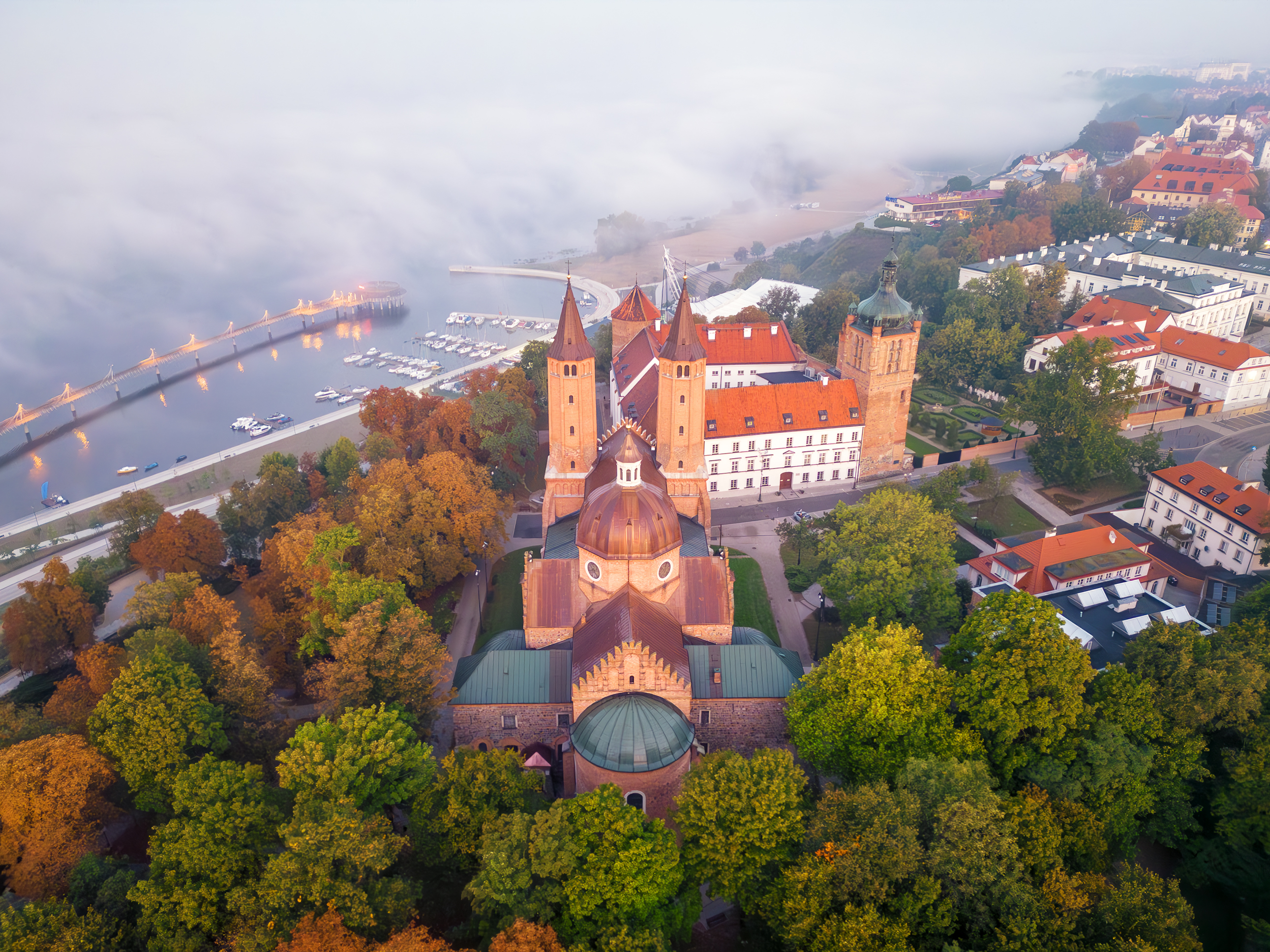
Płock Cathedral

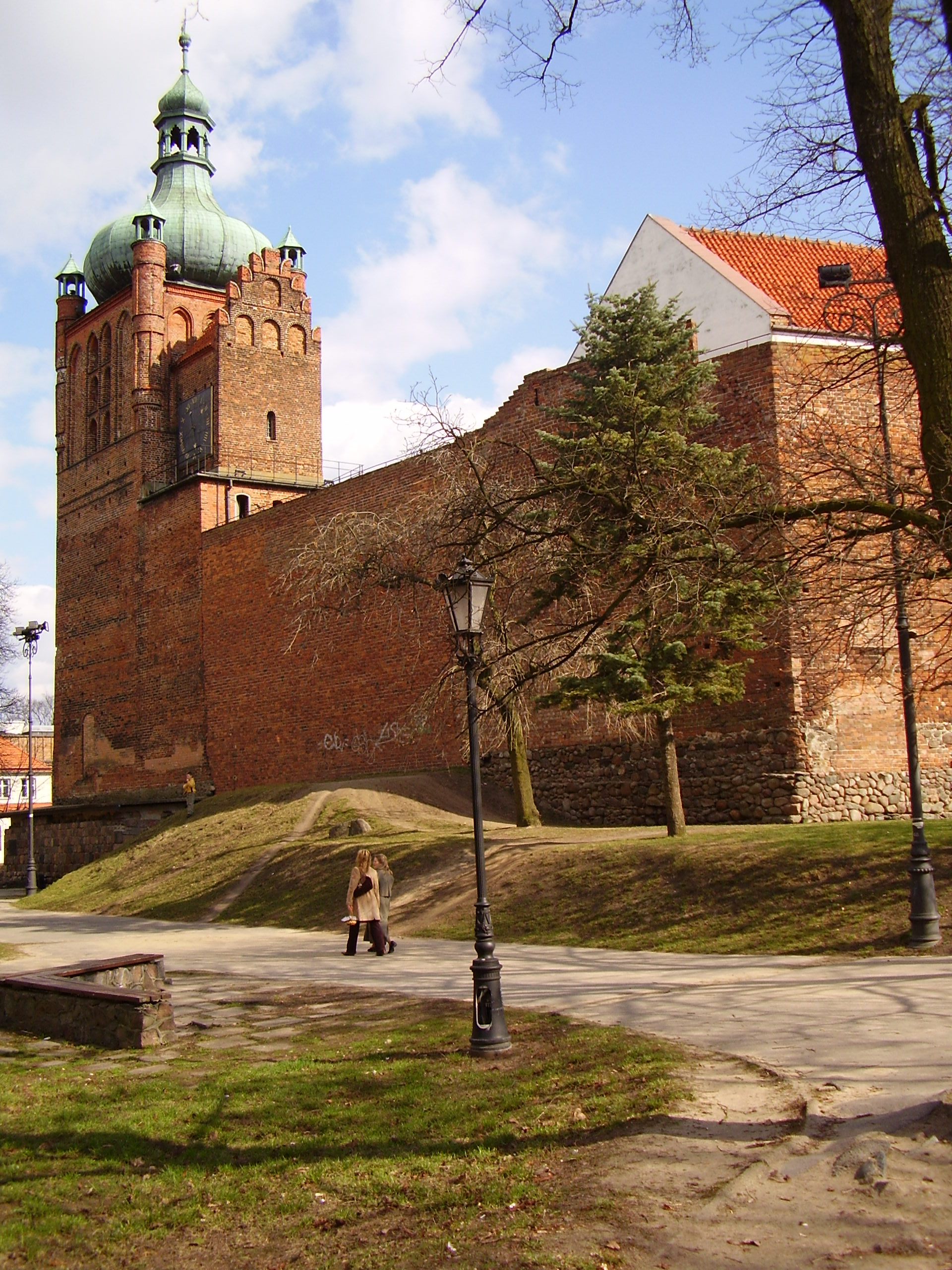
Płock Castle

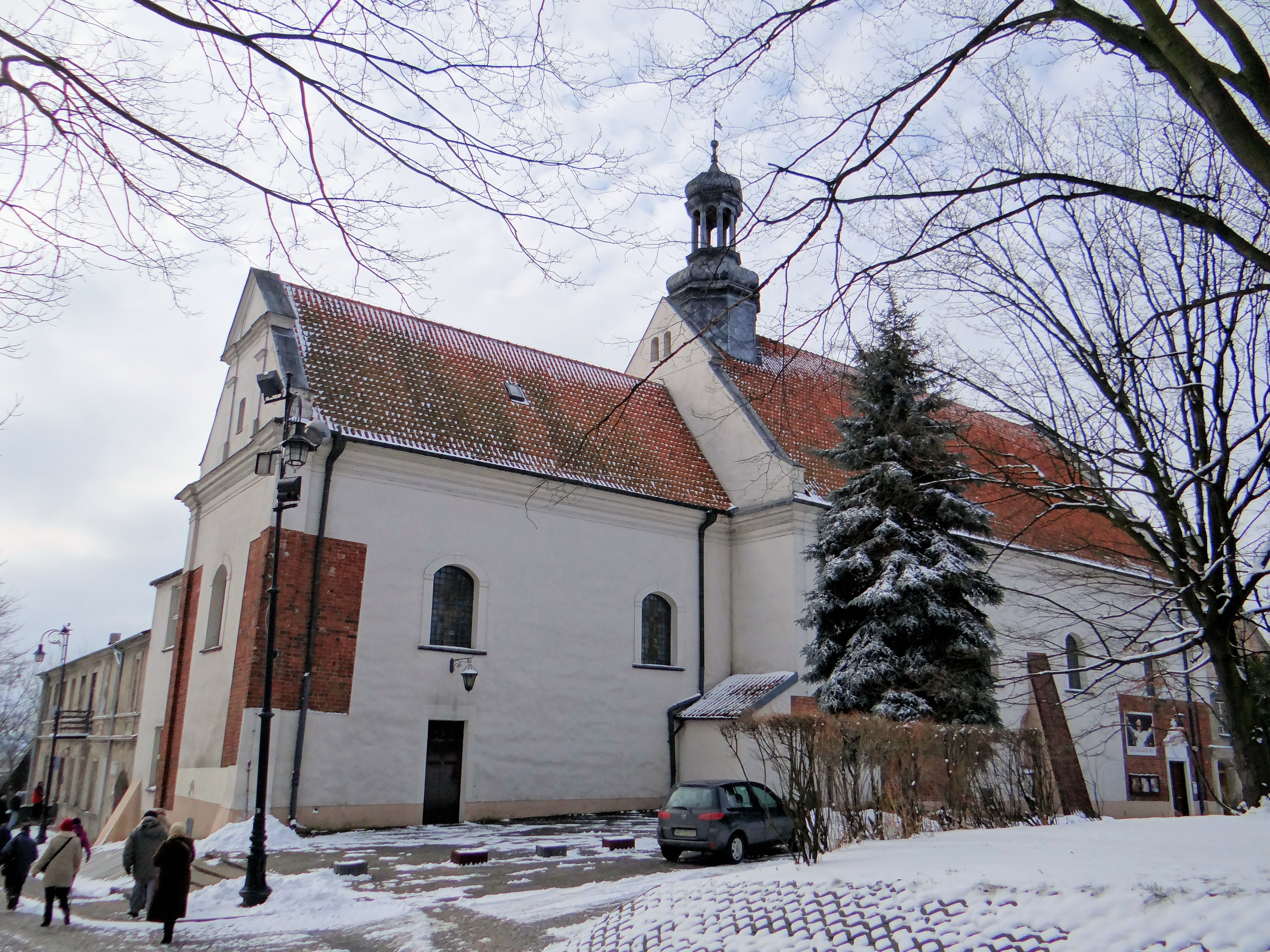
Saint Dominic Church

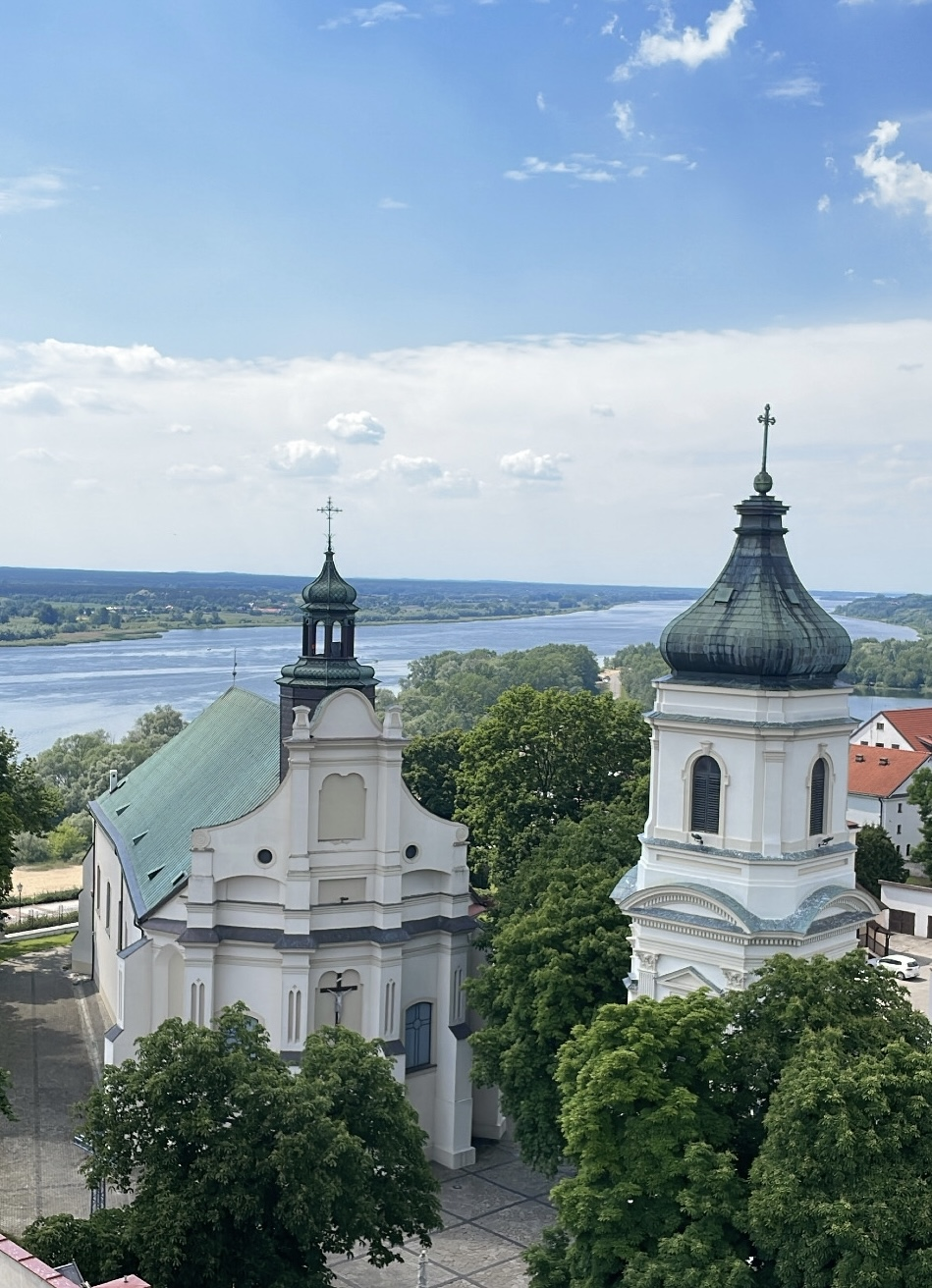
Saint Bartholomew Church

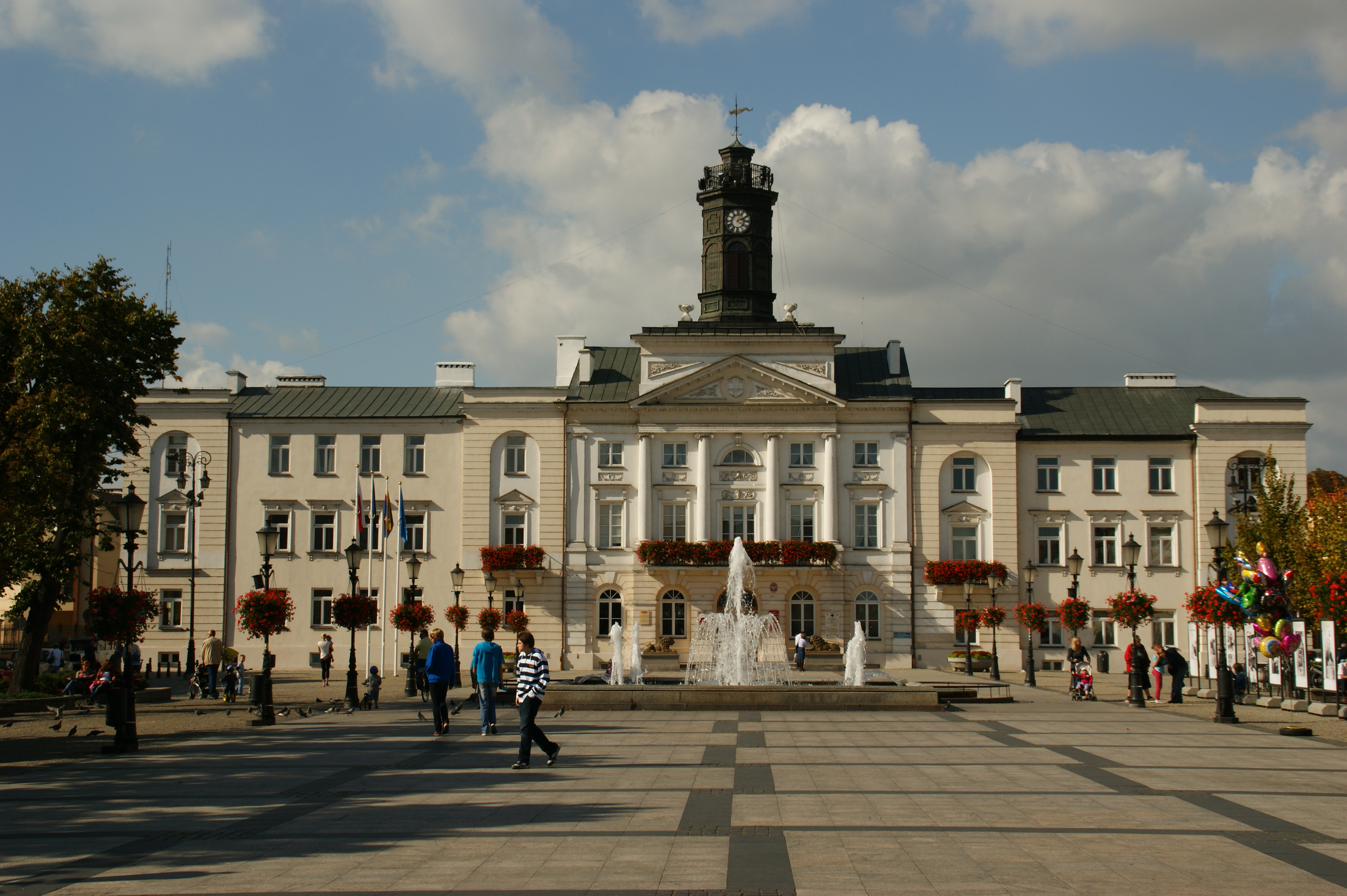
Płock Town Hall

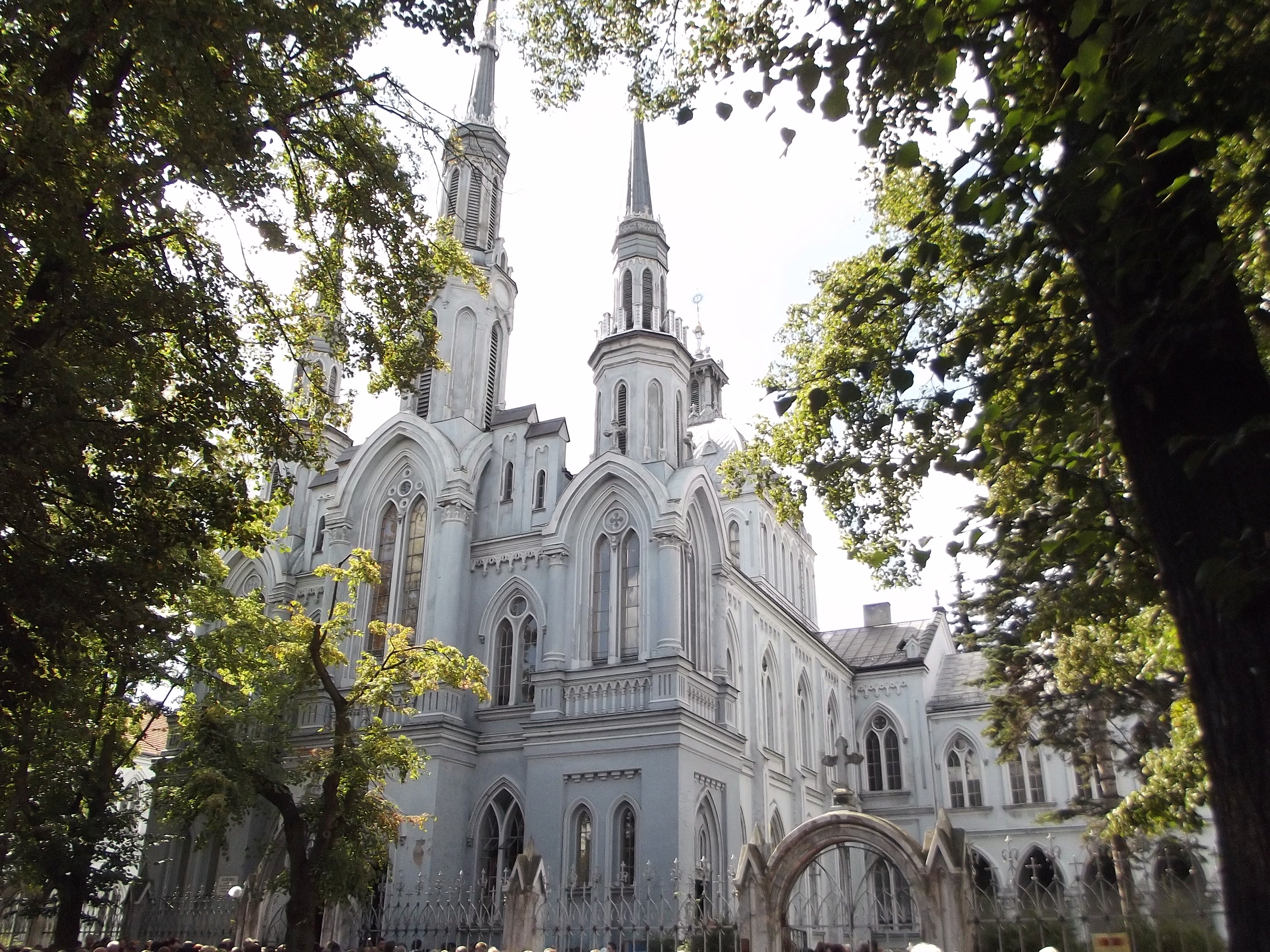
Mariavite Temple of Mercy and Charity

=== Museums ===
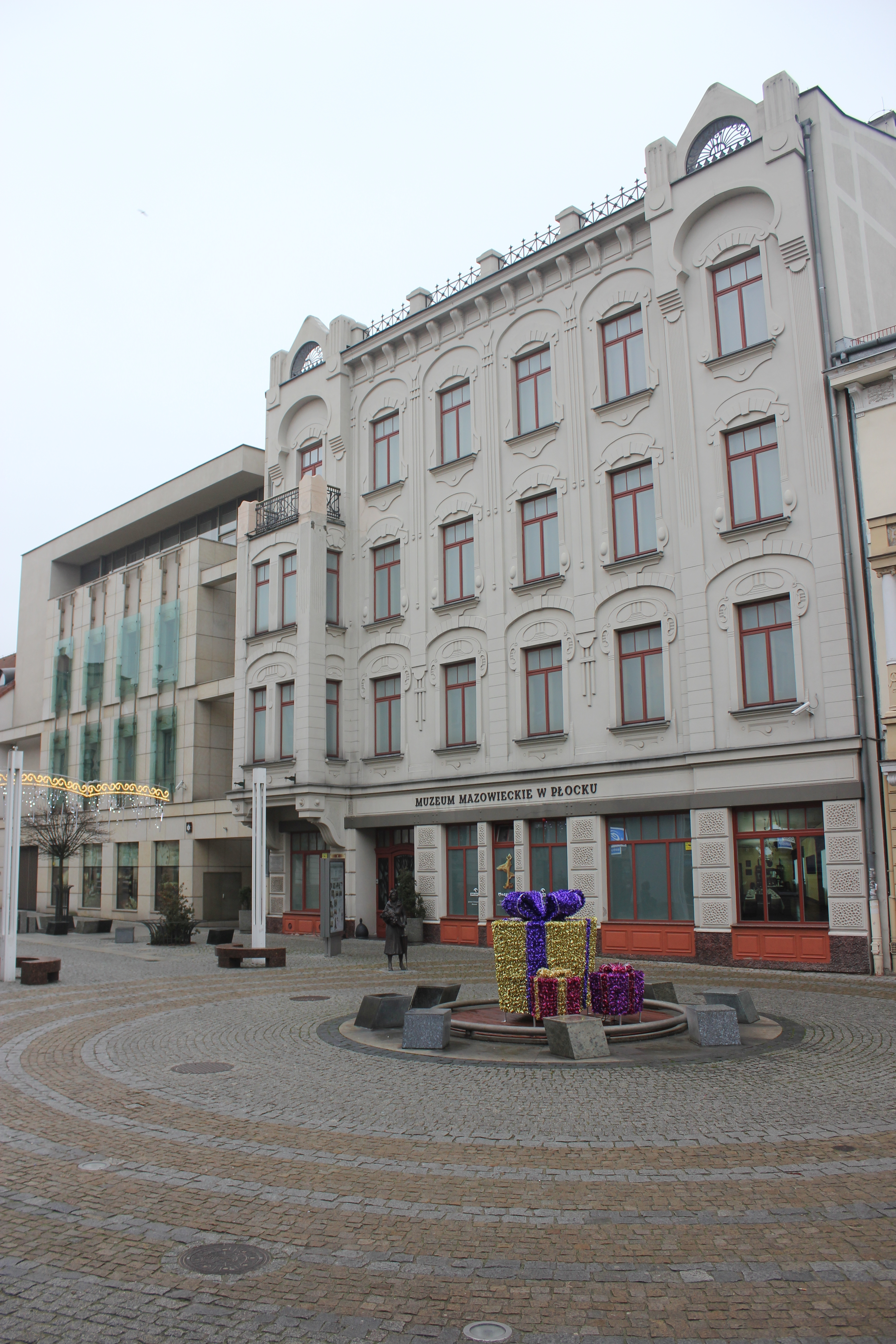
Mazovian Museum

- Diocesan Museum - located in the Płock Castle
- Museum of Masovia - provides exhibits and interpretation of the city and region's history
- The Museum of Mazovian Jews - housed in the former Small Synagogue
- Saint Faustina Museum - museum of Saint Faustina Kowalska
- Małachowianka Museum - museum of the Marshal Stanisław Małachowski High School

=== In popular culture ===
Various Polish films were shot in Płock, including Satan from the Seventh Grade, The Scar, The Doubles, Loving, as well as the 1960s TV series Stawka większa niż życie.

=== Cuisine ===
The officially protected traditional foods originating from Płock (as designated by the Ministry of Agriculture and Rural Development of Poland) include kiełbasa tumska, a local type of kiełbasa named after Wzgórze Tumskie (Cathedral Hill), and baleron płocki, a local type of baleron, a popular Polish smoked lunch meat.

== Religion ==
=== Catholic Church ===
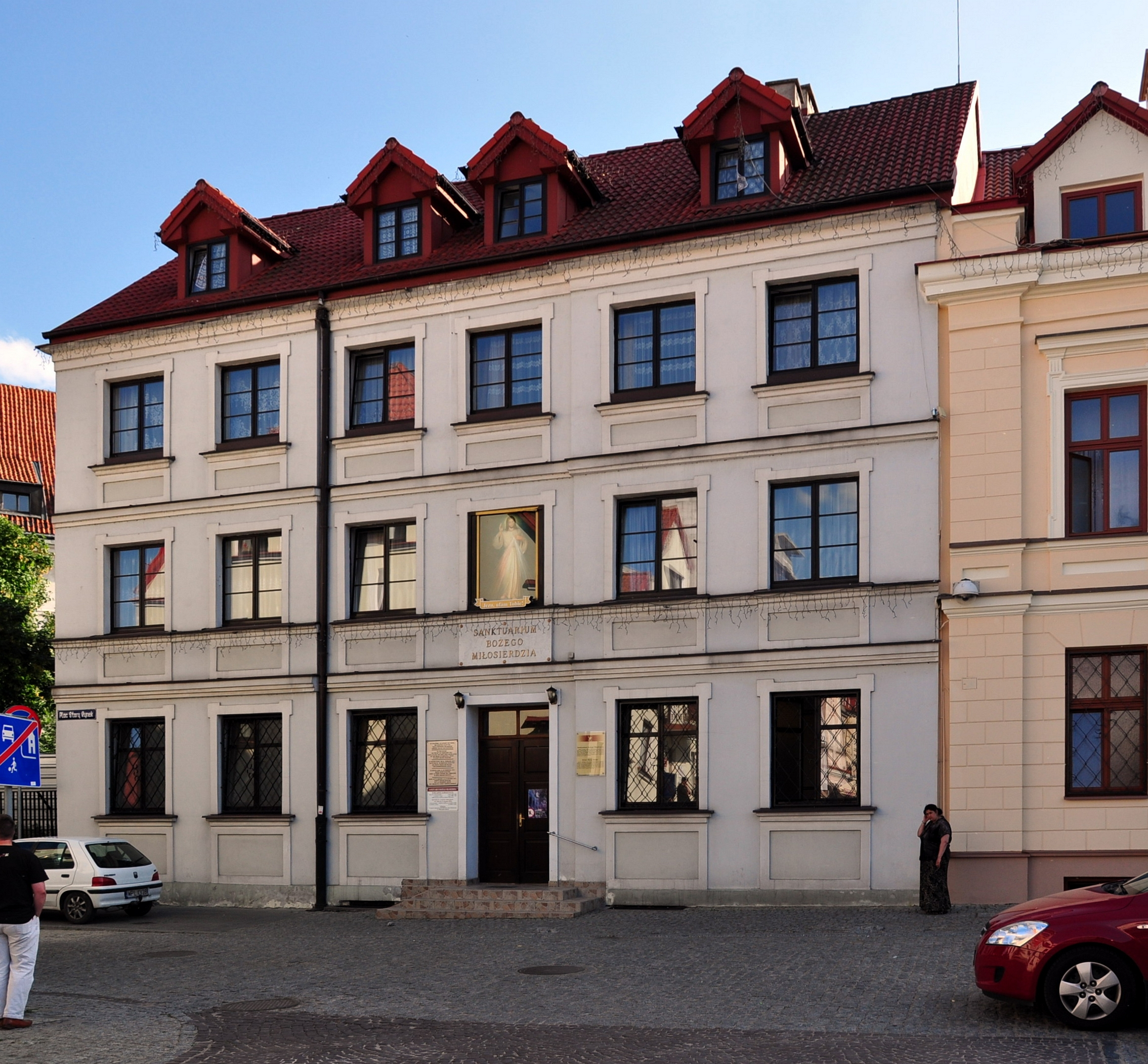
Divine Mercy Sanctuary

Płock is the oldest legislated seat of the Roman Catholic diocese; the Masovian Blessed Virgin Mary Cathedral was built here in the first half of the 12th century and houses the sarcophagi of Polish monarchs. It is one of the five oldest cathedrals in Poland.

Moreover, the city is famous for the Divine Mercy Sanctuary, where the apparition of Jesus to Saint Faustina Kowalska is reported to have taken place, and the Divine Mercy devotion was revealed.

=== Mariavite Church ===
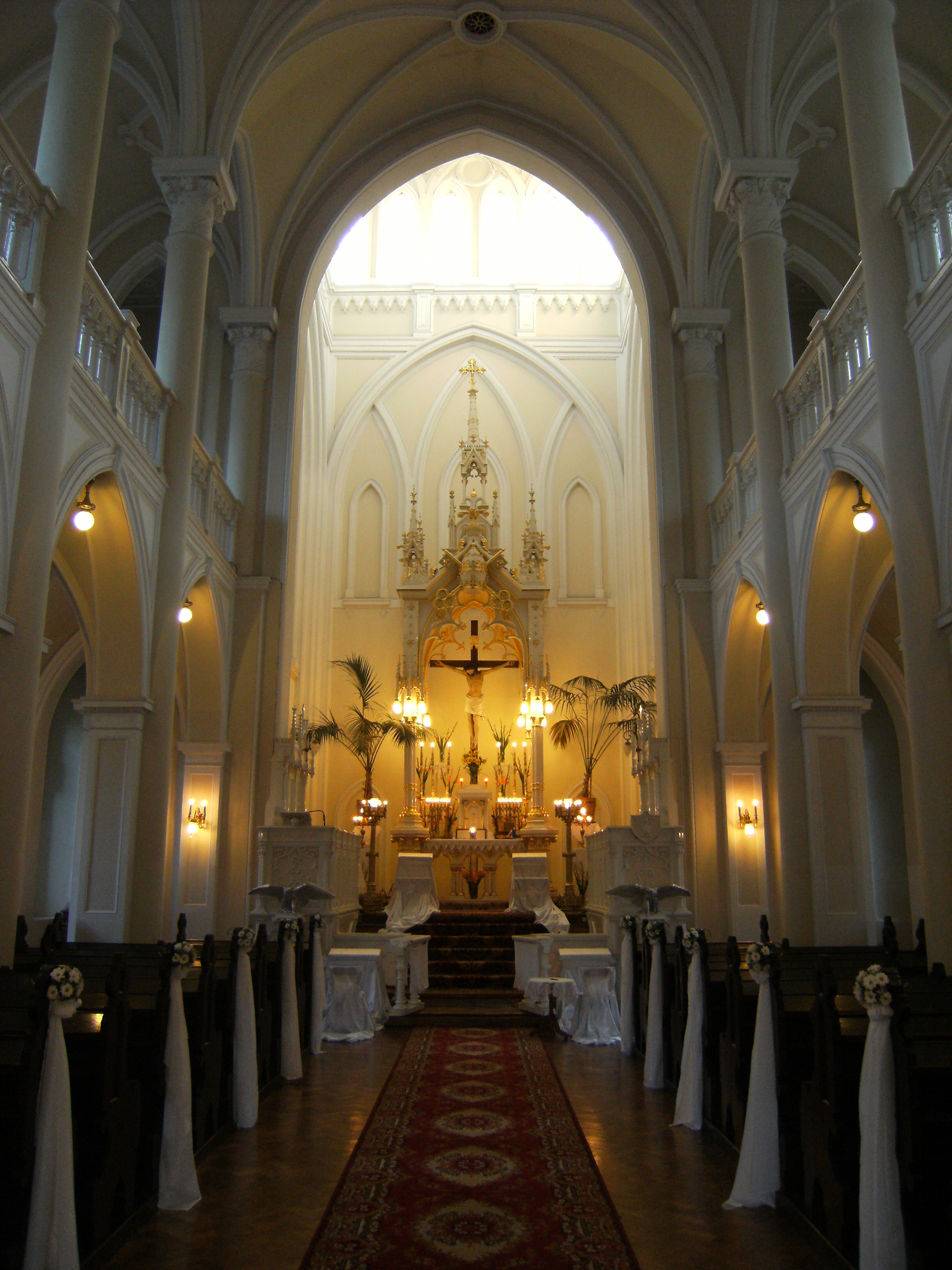
Interior of the Temple of Mercy and Charity - seat of the Mariavite bishops

From the visions of Feliksa Kozłowska in 1893, the Mariavite order of priests originated, originally working to renew clergy within the Roman Catholic Church. Despite repeated attempts, they were not recognized by the Vatican and in the early 20th century established a separate and independent denomination. This site is the main seat of the Mariavite bishops. Their most important church was built here in the beginning of the 20th century; it is called the Temple of Mercy and Charity and is situated in a pleasant garden on the hill on which the historical centre of Płock is built, near the Vistula River. Poland in total has about 25,000 members of the Old Catholic Mariavite Church, as it is now named, with another 5,000 in France. A smaller breakaway church, the Catholic Mariavite Church, which has an integrated female priesthood (since 1929), has 3,000 members in Poland.

=== Jewish history ===
The Jewish presence in Płock (Yiddish: Plotzk) dates back many centuries, probably to the 13th and 14th centuries, when records include them. The Polish kings extended rights to them in 1264 and the 14th century, and provided continued political support through the centuries. At the beginning of the 19th century, their more than 1,200 residents comprised more than 48% of the city's population in what is considered the city's Old Town; through the century, their proportions ranged from 30 and 40 percent. It varied as German migrants were arriving in the region, and the area was becoming urbanized, as more people moved to the city. After Płock fell to Russia in the 19th century, it was part of the Pale of Settlement, where Russians allowed the settlement of Jews. As in other parts of the Russian Partition of Poland, they were restricted to employment in trades and crafts.

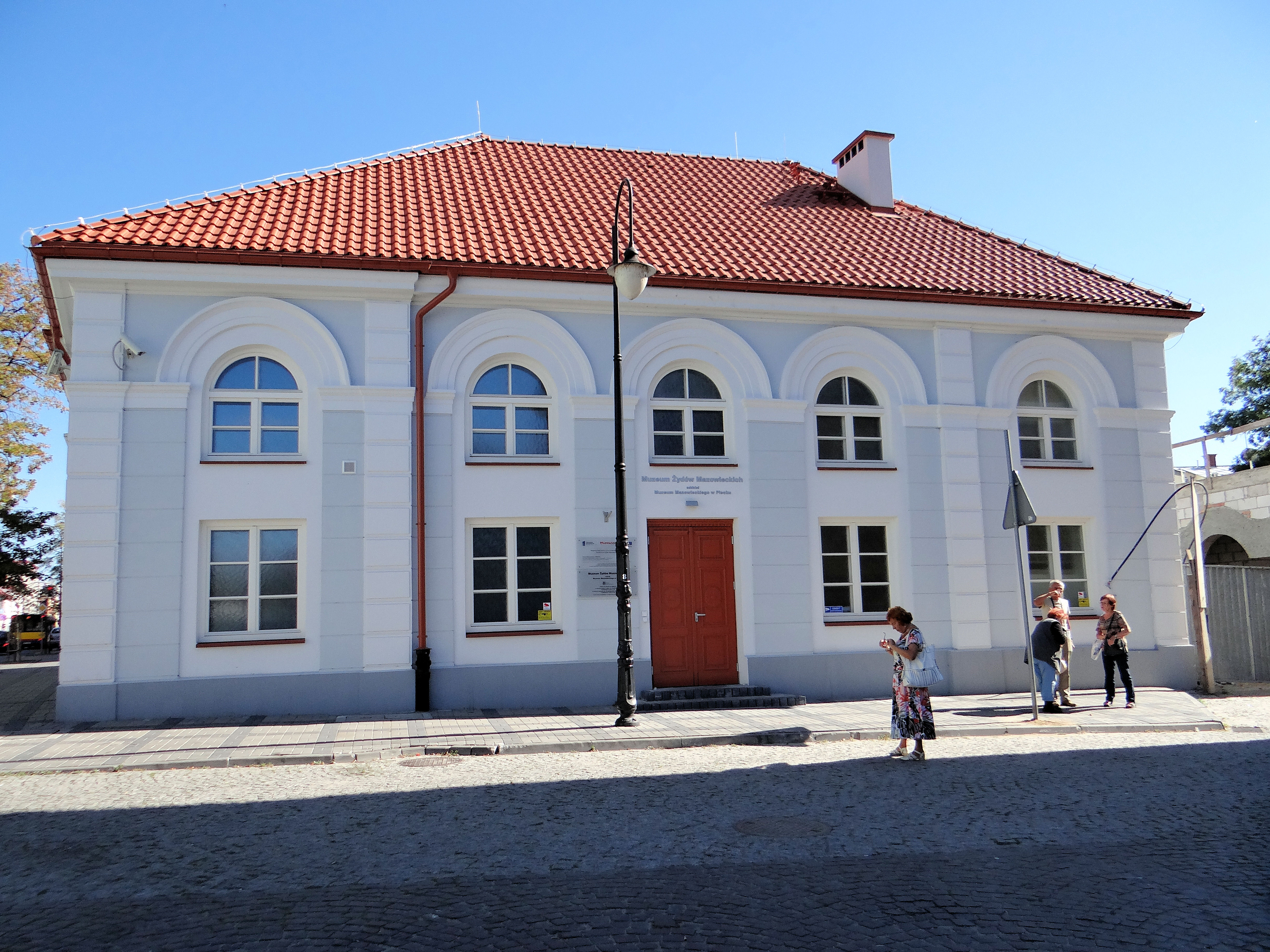
Small Synagogue

In the late 19th century, Moszek Szlama Sarna (1838–1908) established two factories to produce farm machines and tools, and the first iron foundry in the city. The Jewish community had two synagogues and two cemeteries (dating to the 15th century), religious and secular schools, and established a library and hospital. They contributed strongly to the economy and culture of the city. In the early 20th century, and had two newspapers, representing active political parties.

In 1939, Płock had a Jewish population of 9,000, an estimated 26% of the city's total. After the 1939 invasion of Poland, German Nazi persecution began, about 2,000 Jews fled the city, with half going to Soviet-controlled territory. They were assigned to locations far from the front. In 1940, the Nazis established a ghetto in Płock. They started actions against the Jews, killing those in an old people's home and sick children, and transporting others to be killed at Brwilski Forest. Ultimately, they transported the Jews to 20 camps and sites in the Radom district, where in 1942 those still alive were sent to Treblinka to be murdered. There is evidence that a few Poles tried to help their Jewish neighbors in Płock by smuggling food into the ghetto, sneaking food to them while they were awaiting deportation, and throwing loaves of bread to them on the transport trucks. By 1946, only 300 Jews survived in Płock. While they were active in the new politics, gradually the Jews left, and by 1959 three remained. Herman Kruk, a survivor and notable chronicler of life inside the Nazi concentration camps, was born in Płock in 1897.

The small synagogue, built in 1810, was one of the few to survive World War II in the Masovia region of Poland. The Great Synagogue was destroyed during the Holocaust. The small synagogue was designated as a historic building about 1960, but deteriorated in physical condition while vacant. It was renovated and adapted for use as a museum, opening in April 2013 as the Museum of Masovian Jews, a branch of the Museum of Płock Mazowiecki.

== Economy ==
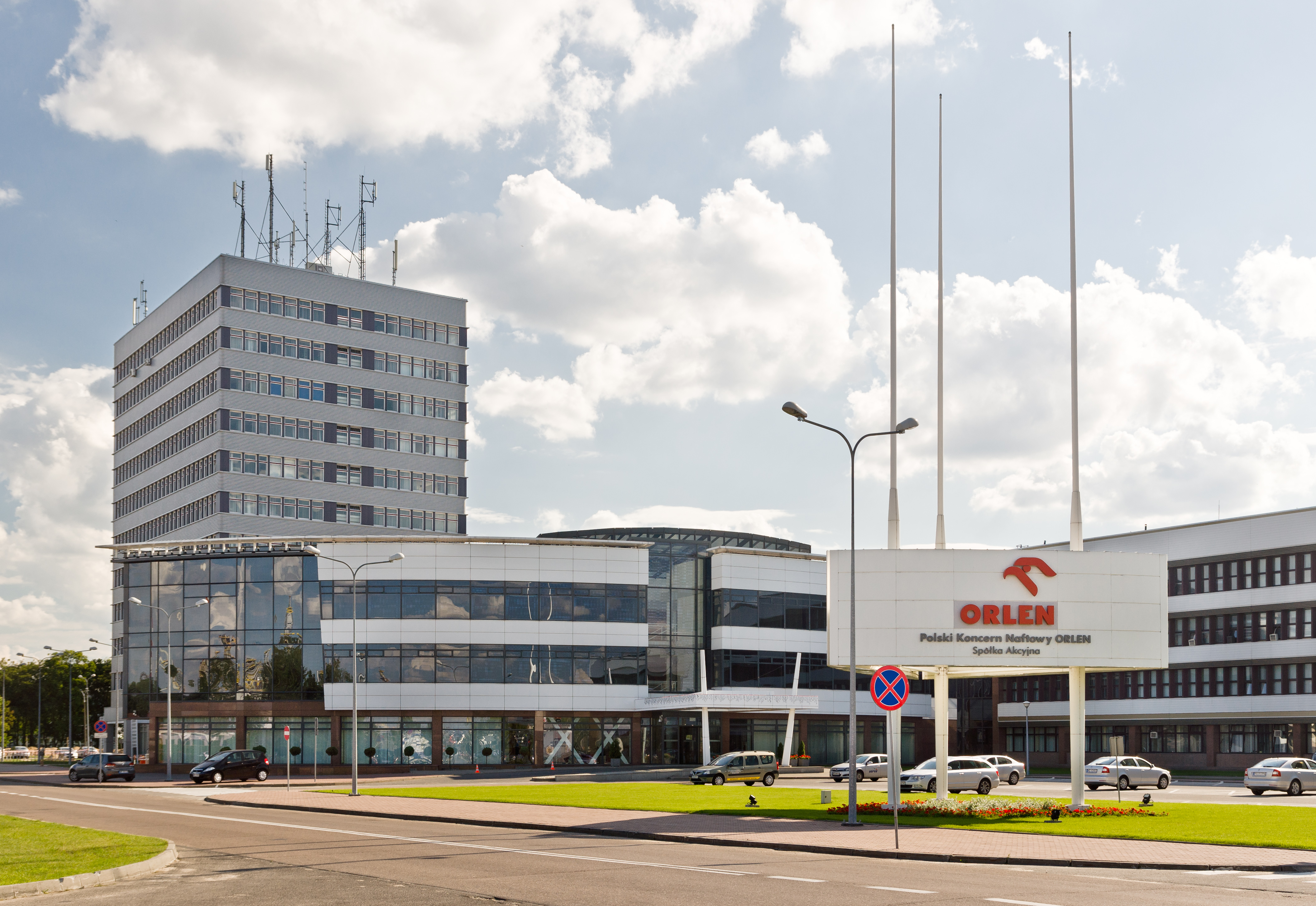
Orlen headquarters

The main industry is oil refining, which was established in 1960. The country's largest oil refinery (Płock refinery) and its parent company, Orlen, are located here. It is served by a large pipeline leading from Russia to Germany. Associated industrial activities connected with the refinery are servicing and construction. A Levi Strauss & Co. factory is located in Płock and provides manufacturing jobs.

== Education ==
- Szkoła Wyższa im. Pawła Włodkowica
- Akademia Mazowiecka w Płocku
- Płock Campus of Warsaw University of Technology
- LO im. Marszałka Stanisława Małachowskiego w Płocku - the oldest school in Poland, dating back to 1180
- LO im. Wladysława Jagiełły w Płocku
- III LO im. Marii Dąbrowskiej w Płocku
- IV LO im. Bolesława Krzywoustego w Płocku
- Zespół szkół centrum edukacji im. Ignacego Łukasiewicza w Płocku

== Transport ==
=== Mass transit ===
- KM Płock - Komunikacja Miejska Płock

Bus service covers the entire city, with 41 routes.

=== Bridges ===
- Pilsudskiego Bridge
- Solidarity Bridge

=== Air ===
There is no airport in the city. The nearest airports are Warsaw's Modlin Airport, located 75 km (47 mi) to the east and Chopin Airport, located 127 km (79 mi) south east of Płock.

== Sport ==
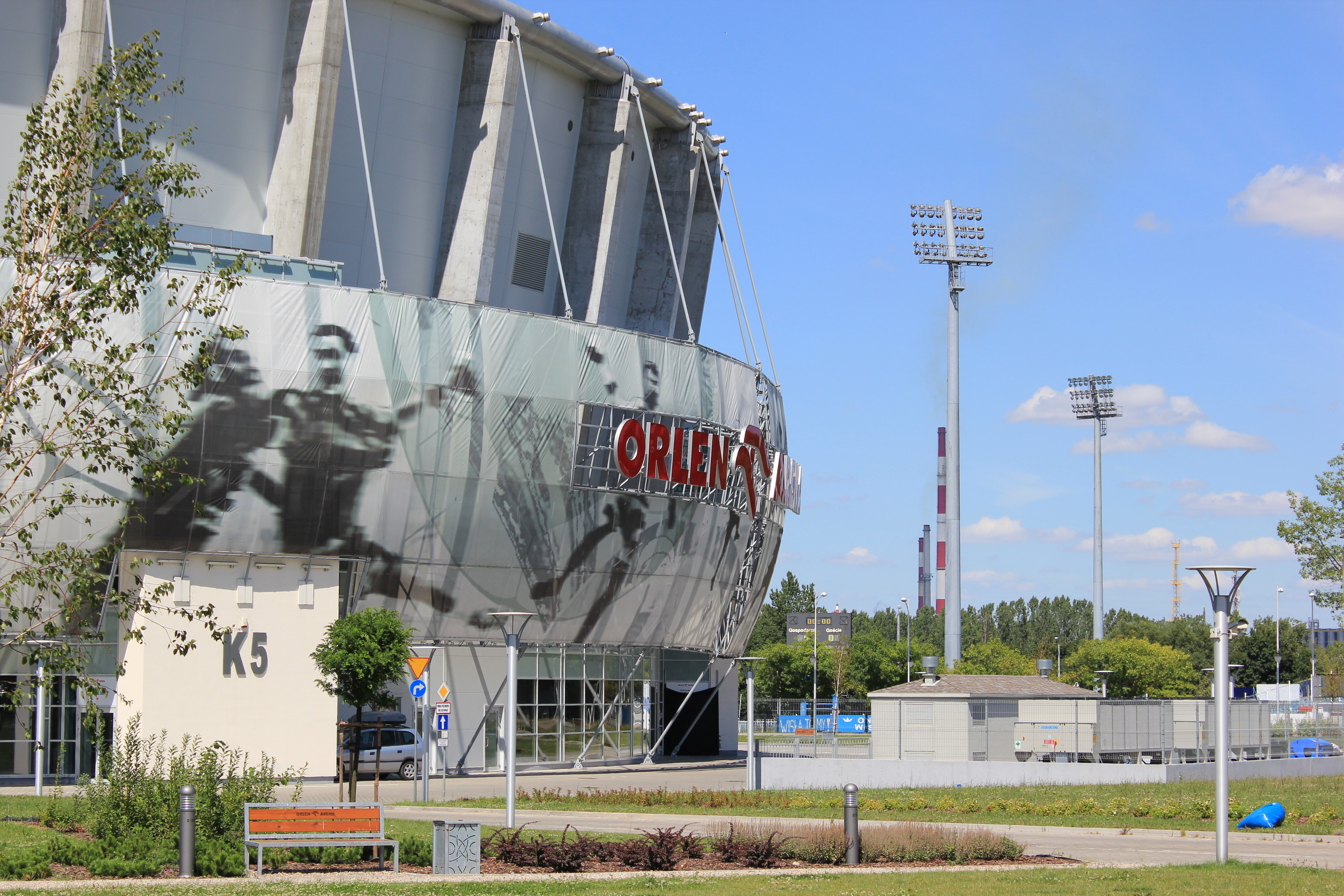
Orlen Arena, home venue of Wisła Płock handball team

- Wisła Płock – one of Poland's most successful handball teams, playing in the Superliga, Poland's top division, multiple Polish Champion and multiple Polish Cup winner
- Wisła Płock – football team, currently playing in the Ekstraklasa; Polish Cup and Polish Super Cup winner in 2006

== Politics ==
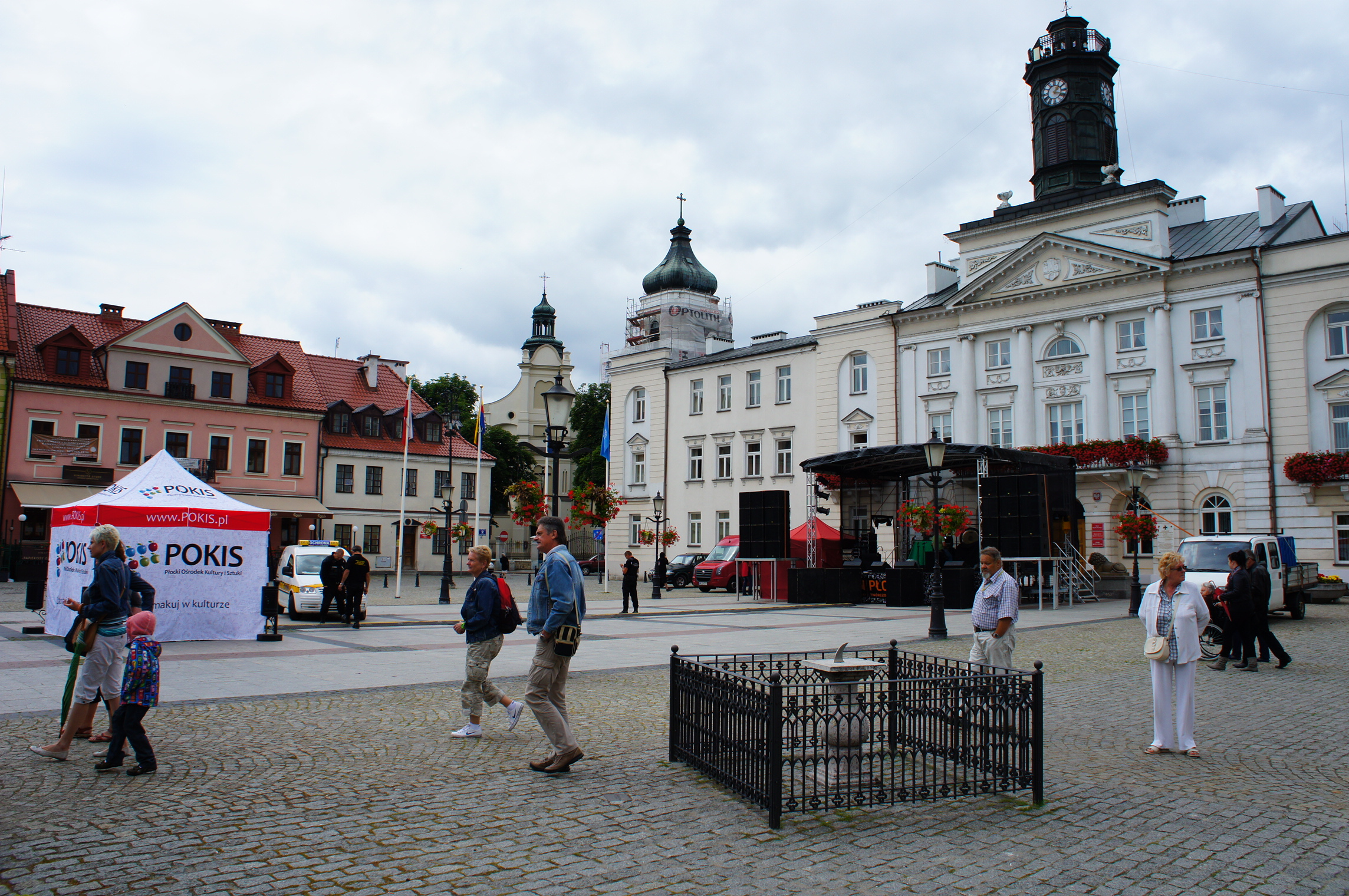
Market Square with the Town Hall

Members of Parliament (Sejm) elected from Płock constituency

- Julia Pitera, PO
- Mirosław Koźlakiewicz, PO
- Andrzej Nowakowski, PO
- Wojciech Jasiński, Pis
- Marek Opioła, Pis
- Robert Kołakowski, Pis
- Dariusz Kaczanowski, Pis
- Waldemar Pawlak, PSL
- Adam Struzik, PSL
- Jolanta Szymanek-Deresz, SLD+SDPL+PD+UP (died in a plane crash 10 April 2010)

== Notable people ==
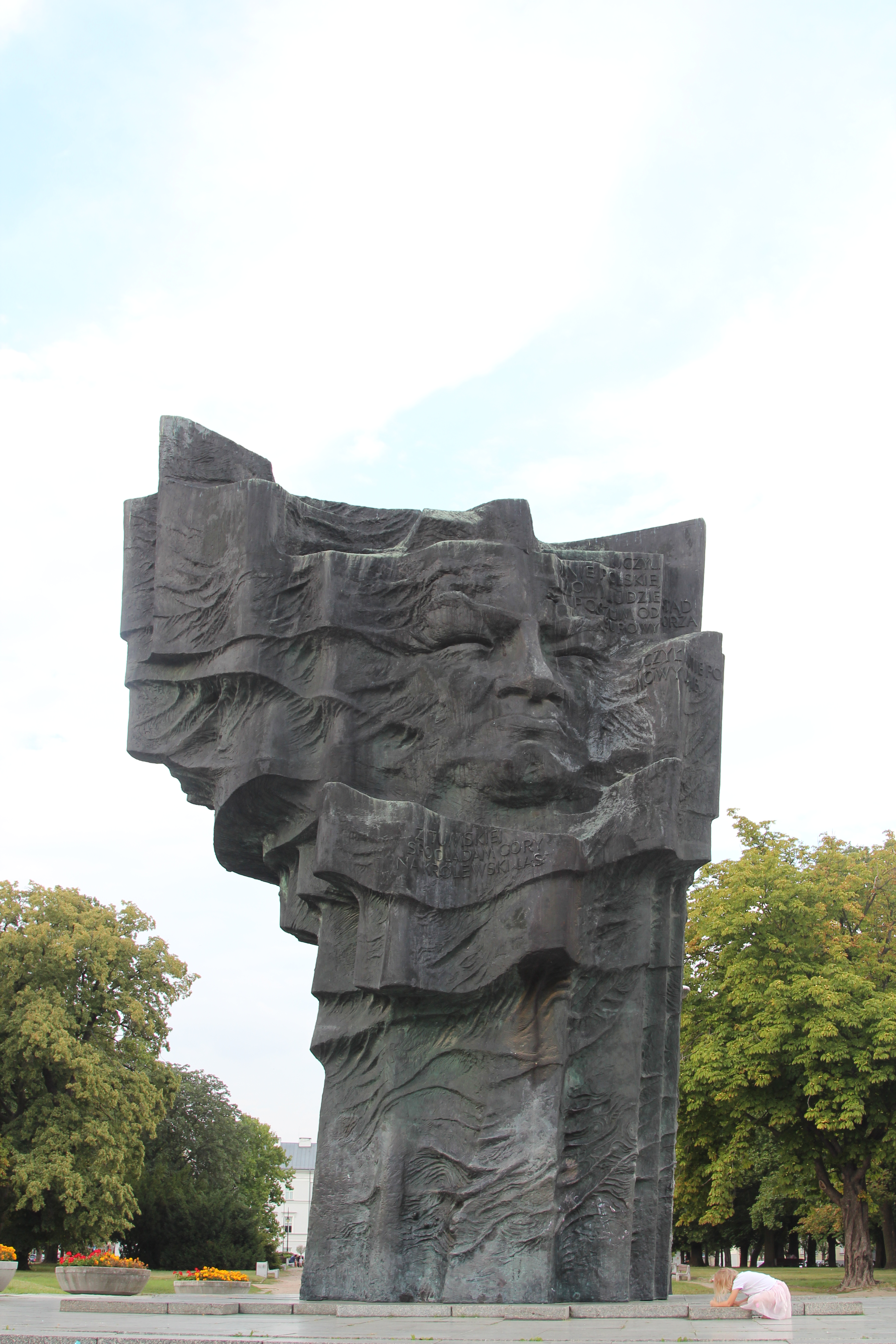
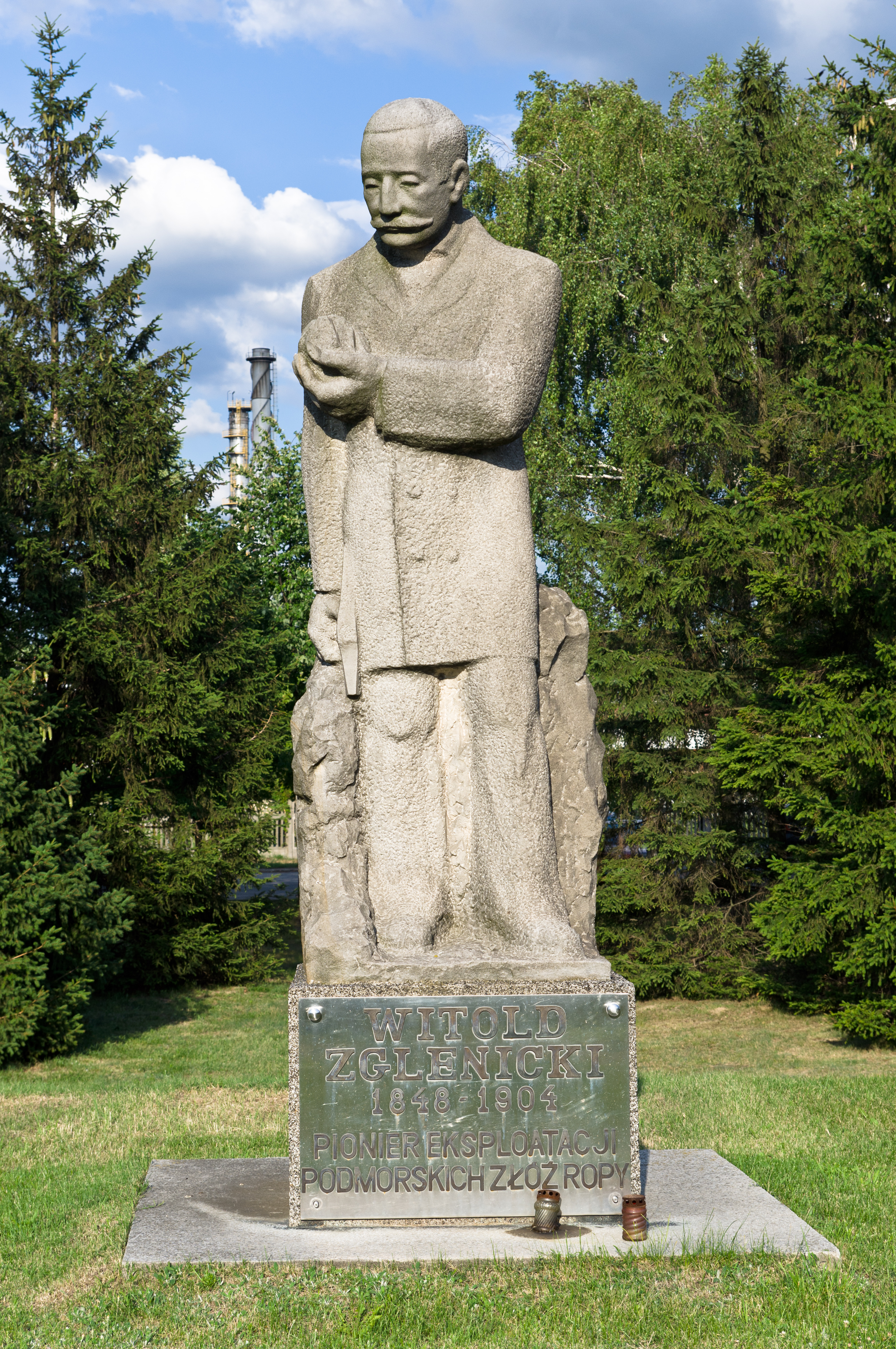
Monuments to prominent figures associated with Płock: Boleslaus III of Poland, Władysław Broniewski, Witold Zglenicki, Mira Zimińska
- Włodzimierz Brus (1921–2007), economist and politician
- Marcin Bułka (born 1999), goalkeeper
- Władysław Broniewski (1897–1962), poet, writer, translator and soldier
- Ireneusz Czop (born 1968), actor
- Józef Pius Dziekoński (1844–1924), architect and heritage conservator
- Edward Flatau (1868–1932), neurologist and psychiatrist
- Antoni Gawryłkiewicz (1922-2007), Holocaust resister and a Righteous among the Nations
- Paweł Halaba (born 1995), volleyball player
- John J. Hopfield (1891–1953), Polish-American physicist, father of John Hopfield
- Wojciech Jankowski (born 1963), rower and Olympic medallist
- Anna Kochanowska (1922–2019), radio journalist, literary director and politician
- Rozka Korczak (1921–1988), partisan leader during World War II
- Ludwik Krzywicki (1859–1941), Marxist anthropologist, economist and sociologist
- Bartosz Kwolek (born 1997), volleyball player, 2018 World Champion
- Michał Łogosz (born 1977), badminton player
- Szymon Marciniak (born 1981), football referee
- Tadeusz Mazowiecki (1927–2013), author, journalist, philanthropist and Christian-democratic politician, formerly one of the leaders of the Solidarity movement, and the first non-communist Polish prime minister since 1946
- Bolesław III Wrymouth (1086–1138), Duke of Poland
- Jerzy Pniewski (1913–1989), physicist
- Ryszard Syski (1924–2007), Polish-American mathematician
- Stefan Themerson (1910–1988), writer of children's literature, poet and novelist
- Kazimierz Zalewski (1849–1919), dramatist, literary and theatre critic
- Aryeh Leib ben Moses Zuenz (c. 1768–1833) The Plocker Gaon, or Genius Płock - noted Hasidic scholar.
- Piotr Więcek (born 1990), drifting driver

== Twin towns and sister cities ==
Płock is twinned with:

- Loznica, Serbia, since 1972
- Darmstadt, Germany, since 1988
- Fort Wayne, United States, since 1990
- Mažeikiai, Lithuania, since 1994
- Forlì, Italy, since 1998
- Auxerre, France, since 2000
- Bălți, Moldova, since 2000
- Thurrock, United Kingdom, since 2004
- Huai'an, China, since 2010
- Pleven, Bulgaria, since 2011
- Zhytomyr, Ukraine, since 2013
- (Georgia (country)) Rustavi, Georgia, since 2016
- Sines, Portugal since 2023

|}

Former twin towns:

- Mytishchi, Russia (since 2006 until 2022)
- Slutsk, Belarus (since 1996 until 2022)

In March 2022, Płock suspended its partnership with the Russian city of Mytishchi and the Belarusian city of Slutsk as a response to the 2022 Russian invasion of Ukraine.

== See also ==
- New Holland Agriculture
