= Marshal Stanisław Małachowski Secondary School in Płock =

Liceum Ogólnokształcące im. Marszałka Stanisława Małachowskiego w Płocku
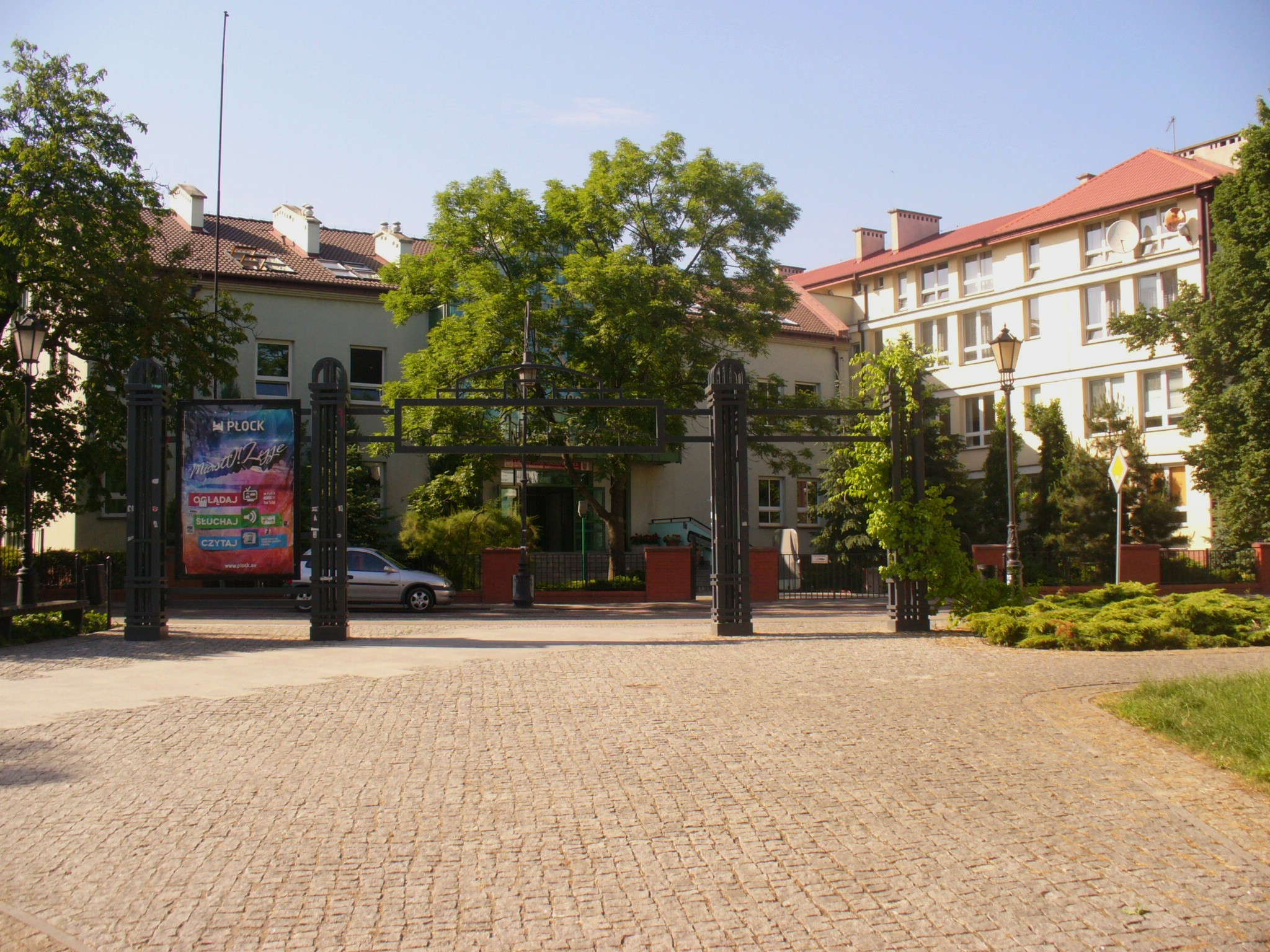

Location
- Stanisława Małachowskiego 1 Płock, Poland
- Coordinates: 52°32′36″N 19°41′13″E

Information
- Type: Public
- Established: 1180
- Website: malachowianka.edu.pl

Marshal Stanisław Małachowski Secondary School (Polish: Liceum Ogólnokształcące im. Marszałka Stanisława Małachowskiego w Płocku) is a school in Płock and the oldest school in Poland. Its roots go back to 1180. It is now a general education secondary school. It was named after the Polish statesman Stanisław Małachowski.

== See also ==
- List of Jesuit sites
