= Congregation of the Sisters of Our Lady of Mercy =

Roman Catholic religious congregation

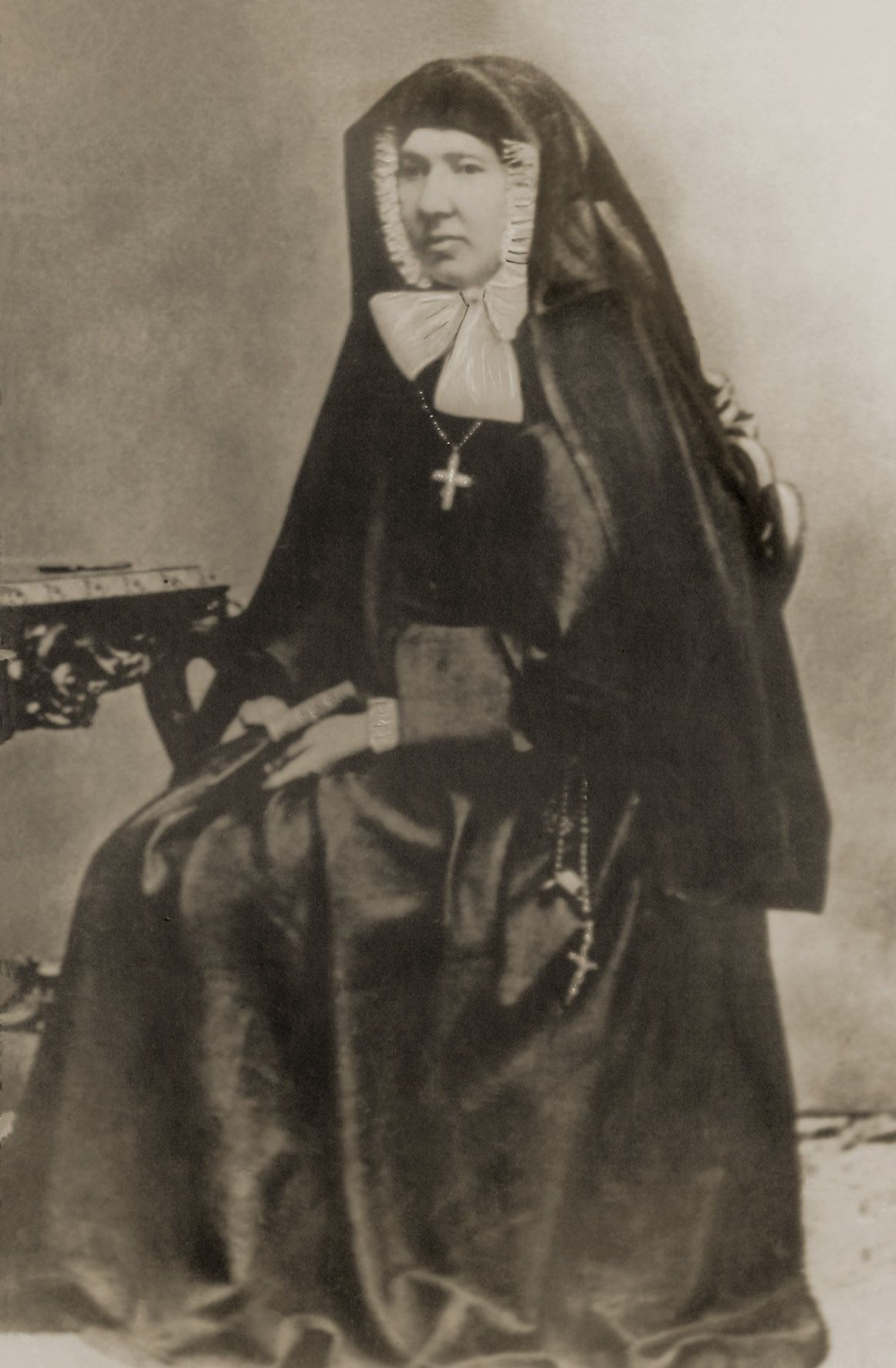
Mother Teresa Ewa Potocka

The Congregation of the Sisters of Our Lady of Mercy (Congregatio Sororum Beatae Mariae Misericordiae (lat)), (Zgromadzenie Sióstr Matki Bożej Miłosierdzia (pol)) - was founded by Mother Teresa Eva Potocka (1814–1881) in Warsaw, Poland on November 1, 1862. This was the first "Mercy House". The order uses the abbreviation O.L.M.

== History ==
=== Origins and development of mission ===
Mother Teresa Ewa, née Countess Potocka of the Sułkowska (family) princes, after eight months of practice in the House of Mercy in the Laval (France) returned to Poland and – at the invitation of Archbishop Zygmunt Szczesny Feliński – took over the shelter (Dom Schronienia pol) in Warsaw for girls failed morally. November 1, 1862 Archbishop Feliński dedicated a chapel and a house for girls. That date was adopted as the date of establishment of the Congregation of the Sisters of Our Lady of Mercy in Poland. In 1878 there was a connection to the assembly on the Laval and obtaining a decree authorizing the activities of the Papal Order. The order has been self-sufficient since 1922.

In communist times, the 1962 Polish government nationalized operations conducted by the congregation.

== Faustina Kowalska ==
In August 1925, in the religious house in Warsaw Helena Kowalska, later Saint Faustina began her postulancy and on April 30, 1926 took her perpetual vows and became a member of the Congregation.

== Congregation ==
=== Congregation in Poland ===
See Divine Mercy Sanctuary (Płock)

=== Congregation in USA ===
In 1986, Cardinal Bernard Law during the pilgrimage to the Shrine in Kraków-Łagiewniki, asked Mother General, Sr. Paulina Słomka, to send several sisters to Boston to create a community of Sisters of Our Lady of Mercy. The three sisters came to Boston on September 15, 1988, where he set up temporarily at the convent in Our Lady of Czestochowa parish. It was the first international meeting house that was founded outside of Poland. October 10, 1993 moved to a permanent house at the Neponset Ave. in Boston.

The congregation also has a convent in Washington, DC.
