= Płock Town Hall =

Town hall in Płock

- Ratusz w Płocku
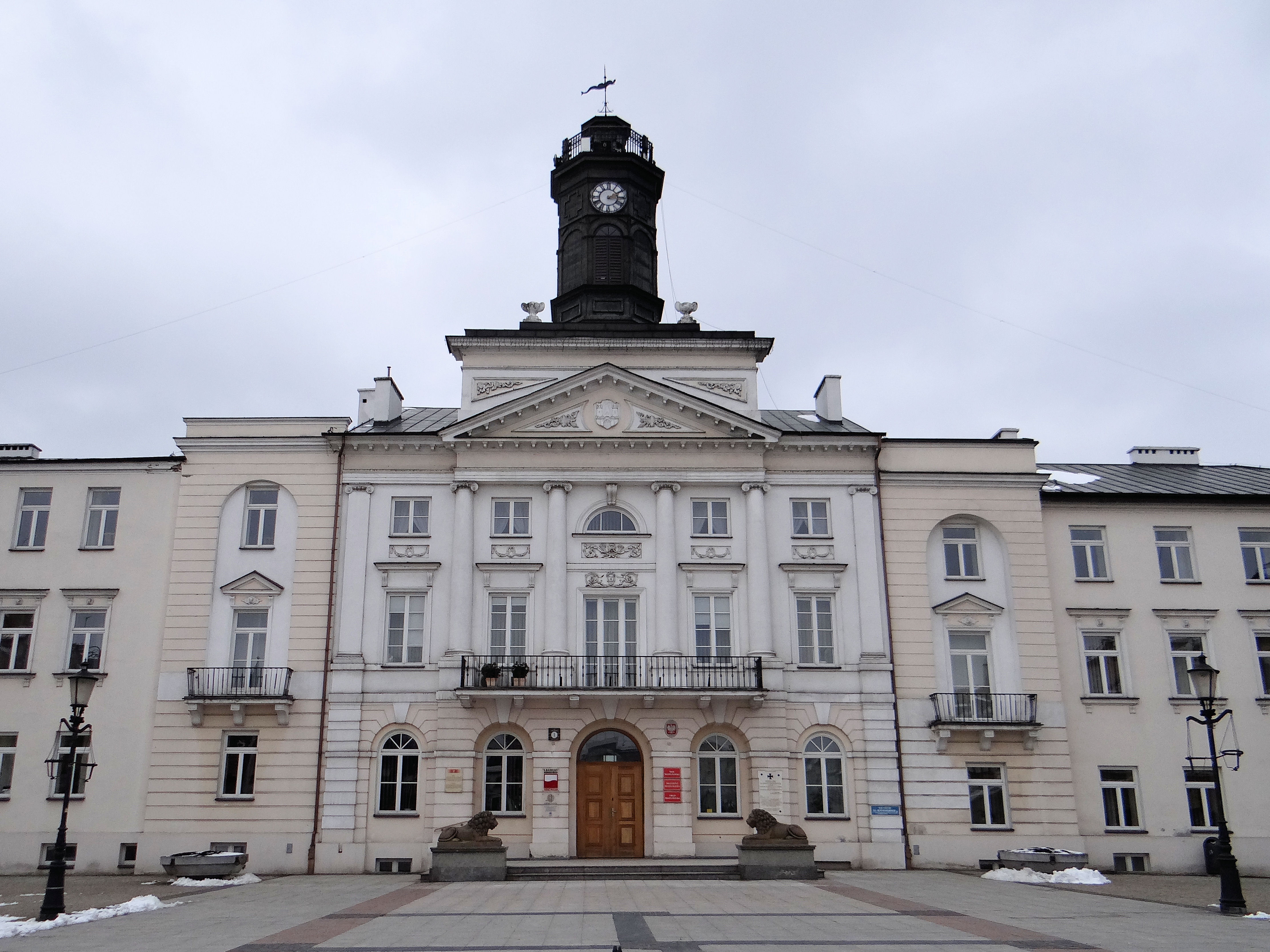
- (Credit: Jolanta Dyr)

General information
- Coordinates: 52°32′43″N 19°41′4″E
- Year(s) built: 1824–1827

The Płock Town Hall is a 19th century Neo-Classical structure in Płock, Poland. It is a protected monument in Poland. It was designed by architect Jakub Kubicki.

The town hall is known for its tradition of playing a bugle call from the tower. The tune was written by Fr. Kazimierz Starościński in the 1930s.

== History ==
According to Bishop Antoni Julian Nowowiejski, a previous town hall structure was demolished in the early 19th century due to being in poor condition. This older structure stood near the middle of the market area which featured butchers and a platform for corporal punishment. Bishop Nowowiejski places the start date for the current city hall as 1820, but other sources state 1824–1827. Jakub Kubicki worked on the town hall in 1826–1827.

On 23 September 1831, during the November Uprising, the last Sejm of the Kingdom of Poland was held at the town hall.

== Architecture ==
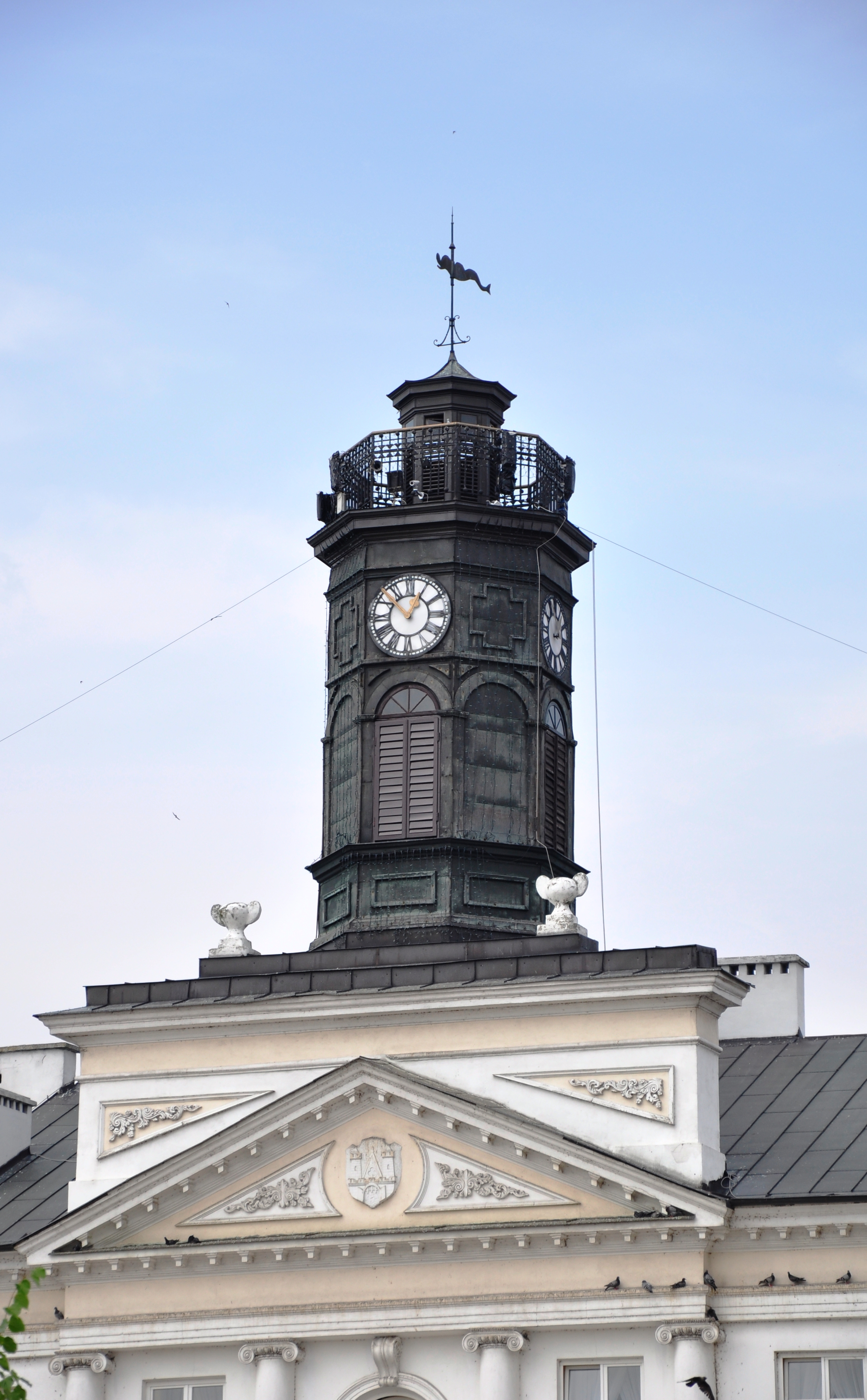
Tower with clock, weathervane, pediment, and columns

== See also ==
- Neoclassical architecture in Poland
