= Arnold McMillin =

British historian (born 1941)

Professor Arnold McMillin
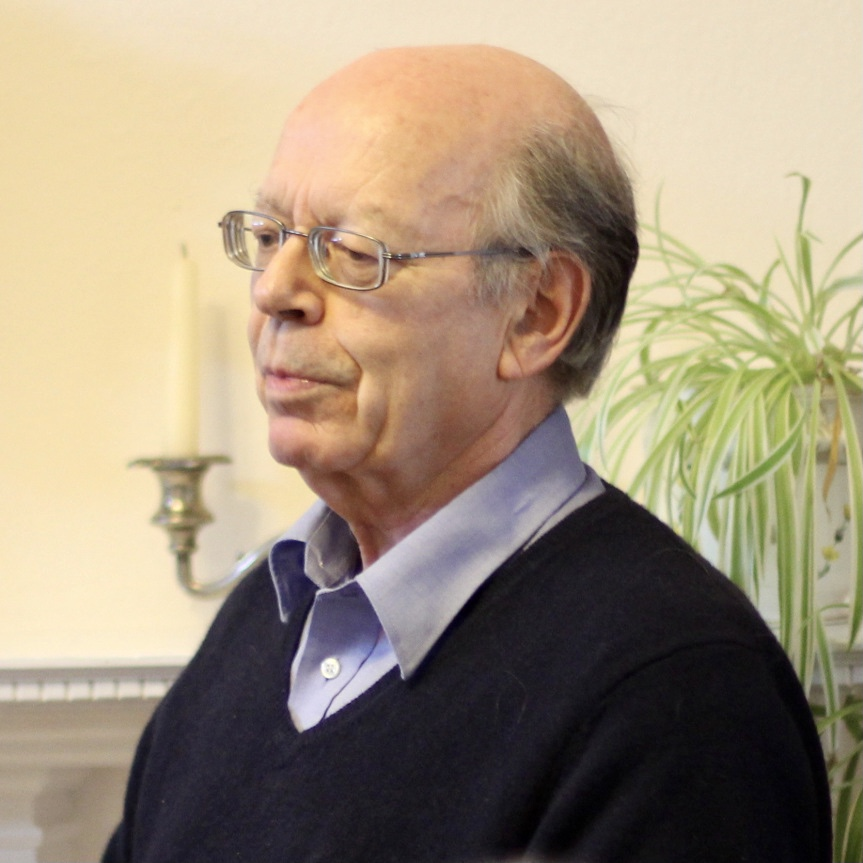
- Born: 21 June 1941 (age 85); Newcastle upon Tyne
- Known for: Contribution to Belarusian studies; author of the first English-language history of Belarusian literature
- Spouse: Svetlana McMillin
- Awards: Belarusian Democratic Republic 100th Jubilee Medal

Academic background
- Education: SSEES
- Thesis: The Vocabulary of the Byelorussian Literary Language in The Nineteenth Century (1971)

Academic work
- Discipline: Slavist
- Sub-discipline: Belarusian Literature
- Notable works: A History of Byelorussian Literature: From Its Origins to The Present Day
- Website: UCL IRIS Profile

Arnold Barratt McMillin (born 21 June 1941) is a British scholar of Belarusian and Russian studies, Emeritus Professor of Russian Literature, and the author of the first English-language history of Belarusian literature.

== Life ==
Arnold McMillin studied at the University of London where he earned a PhD in Slavic Philology in 1971. The topic of his dissertation - the vocabulary of the Belarusian literary language in the 19th century - was suggested by a prominent slavist, Robert Auty. Belarus was a completely neglected field of Slavonic studies at that time. In writing the dissertation, McMillin drew upon the resources and expertise of what would become the Francis Skaryna Belarusian Library and Museum in London.

McMillin taught the Russian language and literature at the University of London (1965–76) and the University of Liverpool (1976–88). In 1988-2006, he was a professor of Russian literature at the University of London.

From 1960s, McMillin has supported the Belarusian community and academic Belarusian studies in Britain. He edited the Journal of Belarusian Studies (1967-1971), was a vice-president of the Anglo-Belarusian Society and delivered many talks organised by the Society. He was one of the trustees of the Belarusian library in London when it became a registered charity, serving on the Board of Trustees for 41 years.

In 1984-86, McMillin was the President of the British Universities Association of Slavists; in 1978-88, a British representative at the International Committee of Slavists; a member of the International Association of Scholars of Belarusian Studies.

== Academic work ==
McMillin authored eight monographs and over 100 articles on Belarusian literature, and over 30 articles about Russian literature and music. He published over 500 book reviews and introductions, and edited 13 books.

McMillin's PhD dissertation became the base for his first monograph, The Vocabulary of the Byelorussian Literary Language in the Nineteenth Century, published by the Anglo-Belarusian Society in 1973.

McMillin's A History of Byelorussian Literature from Its Origins to the Present Day (1977) was the first English-language history of Belarusian literature.

== Curious facts ==
- From the very first publications, McMillin has been using the traditional Belarusian Latin alphabet, Łacinka, for transliteration of the Belarusian proper names and other words in his works. He has been criticised for this practice by some Slavists advocating the use of "a standard English transliteration to Cyrilling spelling".
- In the only review of A History of Byelorussian Literature from Its Origins to the Present Day published in Soviet Belarus, McMillin was labeled "bourgeois objectivist" – a made-up ideological description to calm the editors' fears and ensure the article would pass through censors.

== Books ==
- Poetry and parody in Belarus and Britain : two cultural traditions. Centrum Badań Europy Wschodniej. Olsztyn: Centrum Badań Europy Wschodniej Uniwersytetu Warmińsko-Mazurskiego w Olsztynie. 2021. pp. Back cover. ISBN 978-83-61605-51-5. OCLC 1244614493.
