= St Pancras and Islington Cemetery =

Cemetery in the London Borough of Barnet

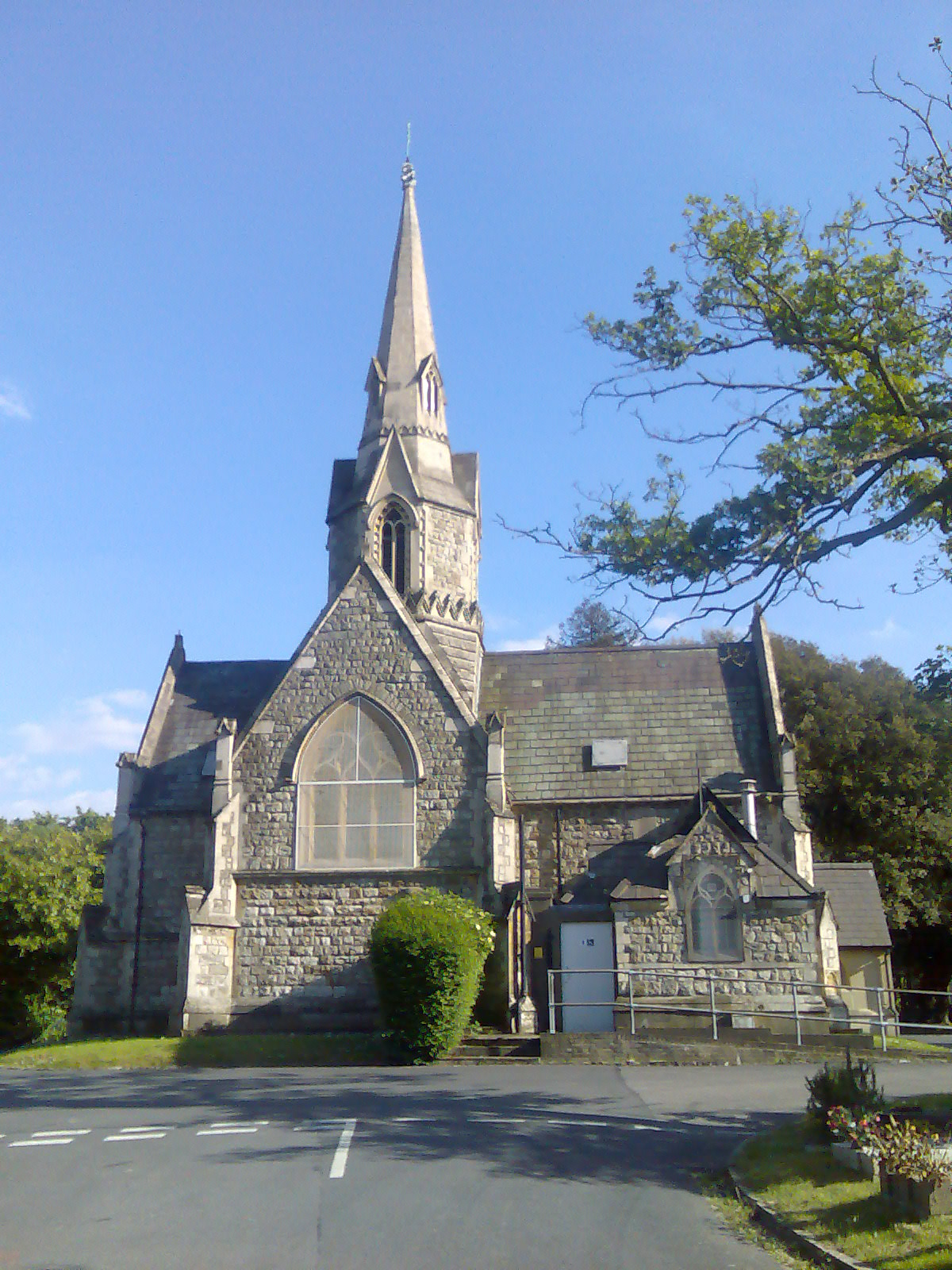
- Islington Chapel, English Heritage Listed Building Grade II
- Interactive map of St Pancras and Islington Cemetery

Details
- Established: 1854
- Location: East Finchley, London
- Country: England
- Coordinates: 51.5979°N 0.1683°W
- Type: Public
- Owned by: Islington and Camden Cemetery Services
- Size: 190 acres (77 ha)
- No. of interments: around 1 million
- Website: iccslondon.co.uk/the-sites/islington-and-st-pancras-cemetery/

St Pancras and Islington Cemetery is a large cemetery in East Finchley, North London. Although it is situated in the London Borough of Barnet, it is run as two cemeteries, owned by two other London Boroughs, Camden (formerly St Pancras) and Islington. The fence along the boundary which runs west to east between the two parts of the cemetery has been removed, although the line of it is still marked.

St Pancras and Islington is the third-largest cemetery by land size in the country and is the largest in terms of burial numbers with around one million interments and cremations. The cemetery is designated Grade II* on the English Heritage Register of Parks and Gardens of Special Historic Interest in England. The cemetery was the first publicly owned cemetery in London.

== Cemetery ==
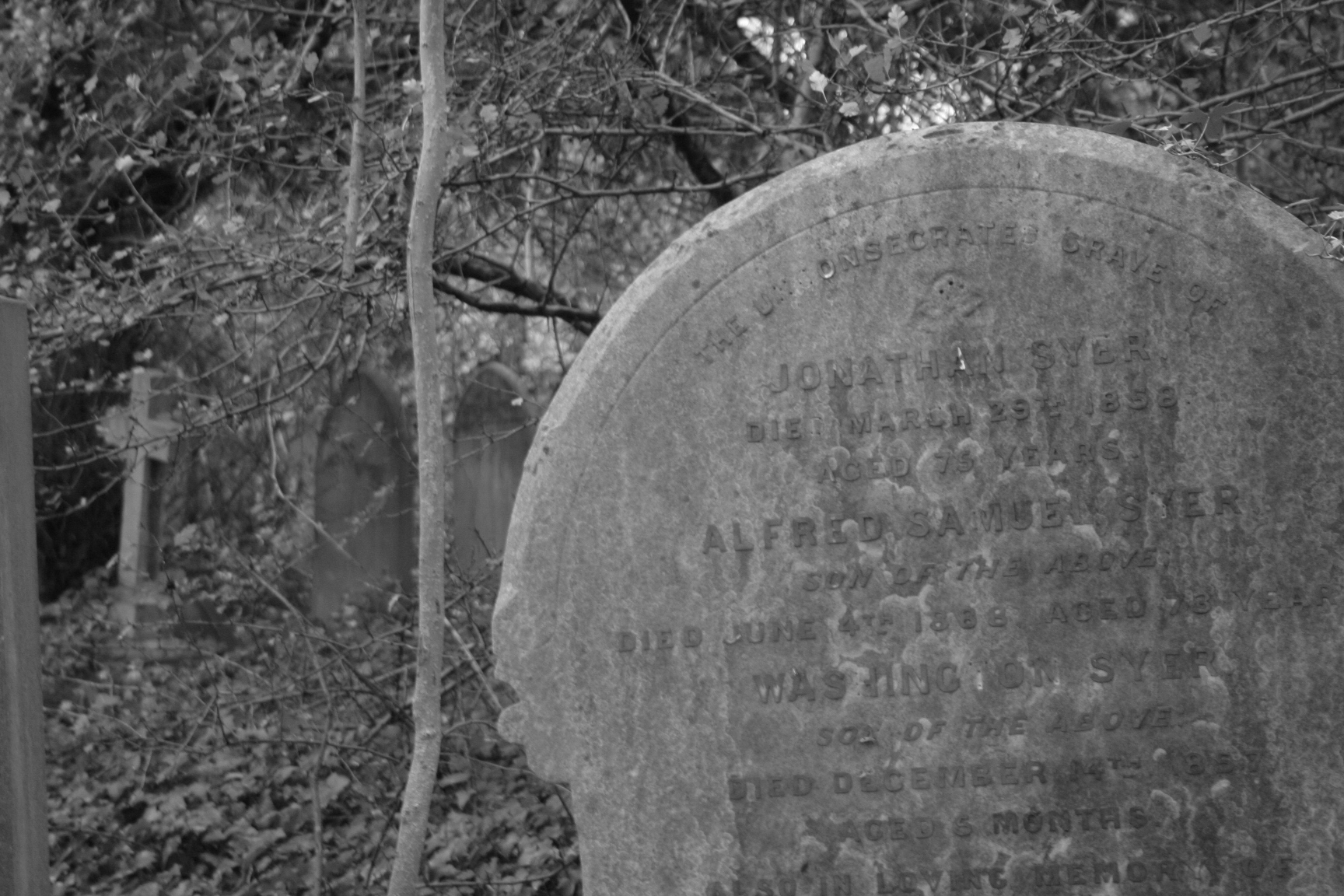
Headstone from the eastern boundary

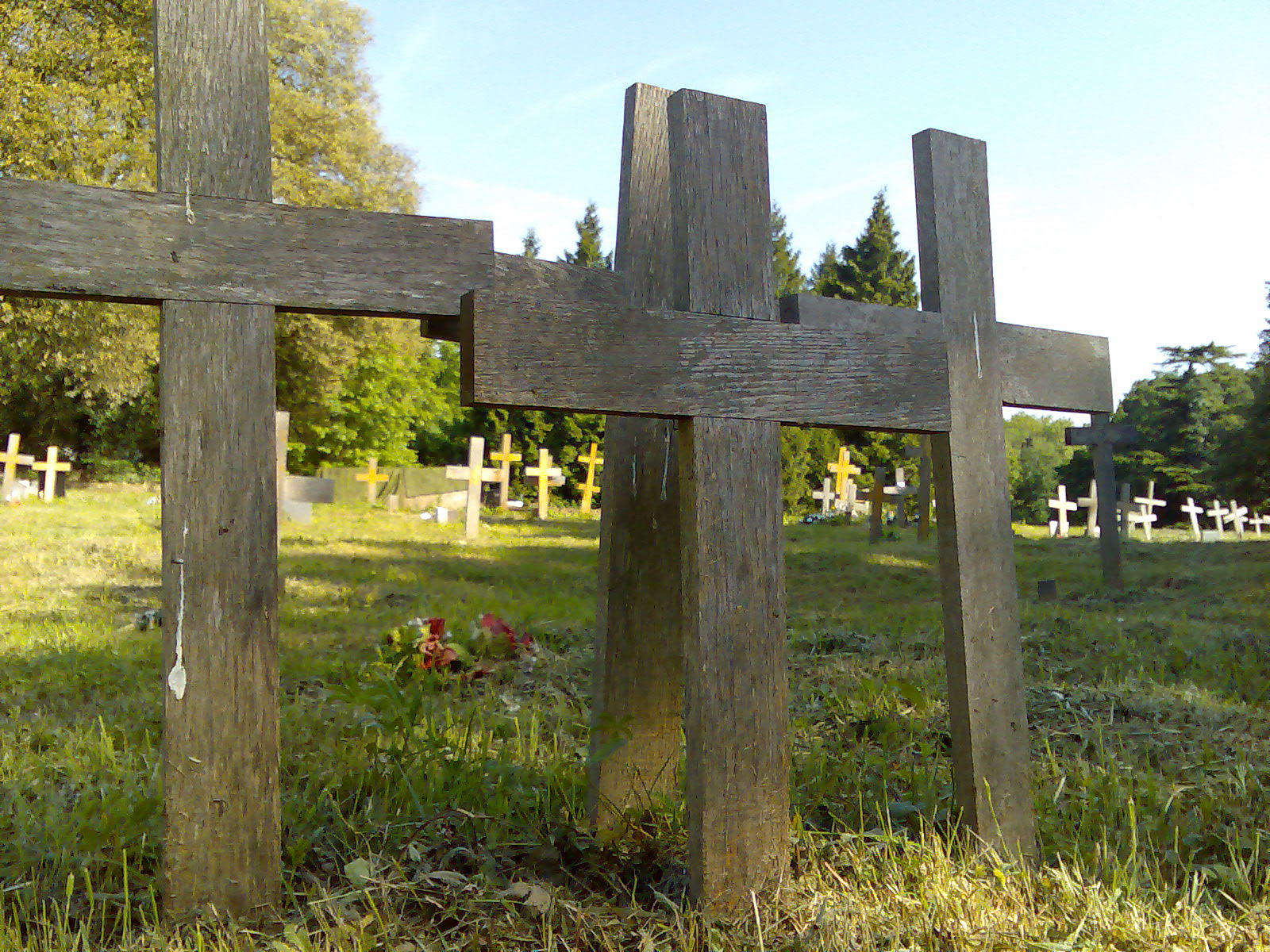
Wooden grave markers

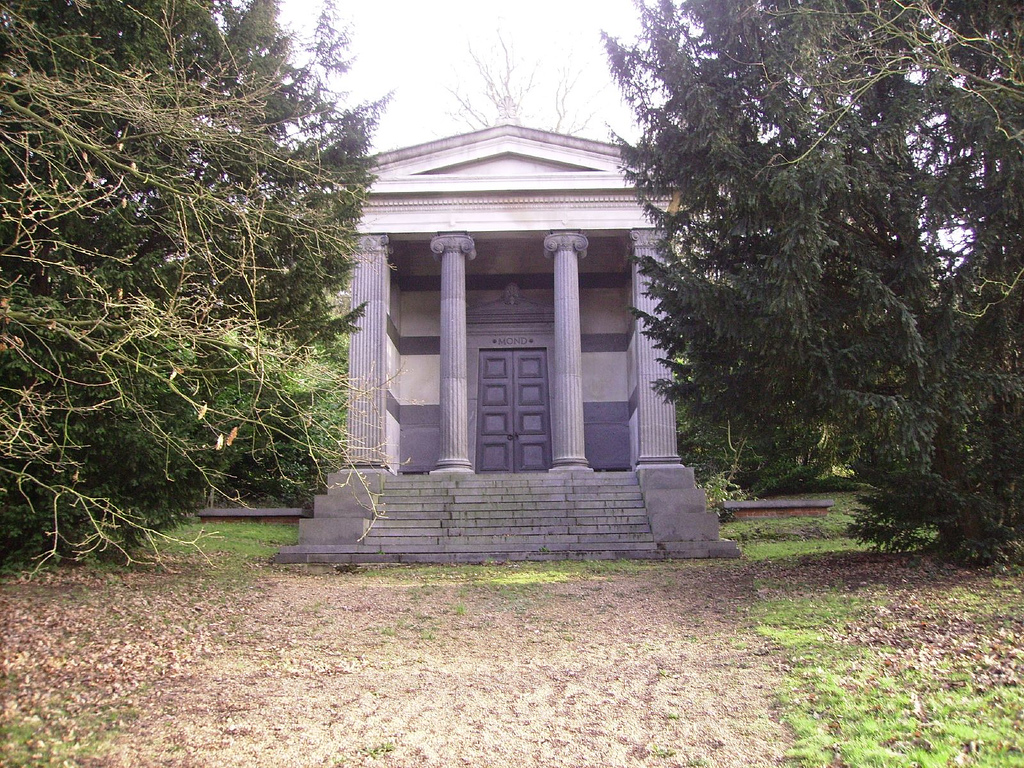
Mond mausoleum

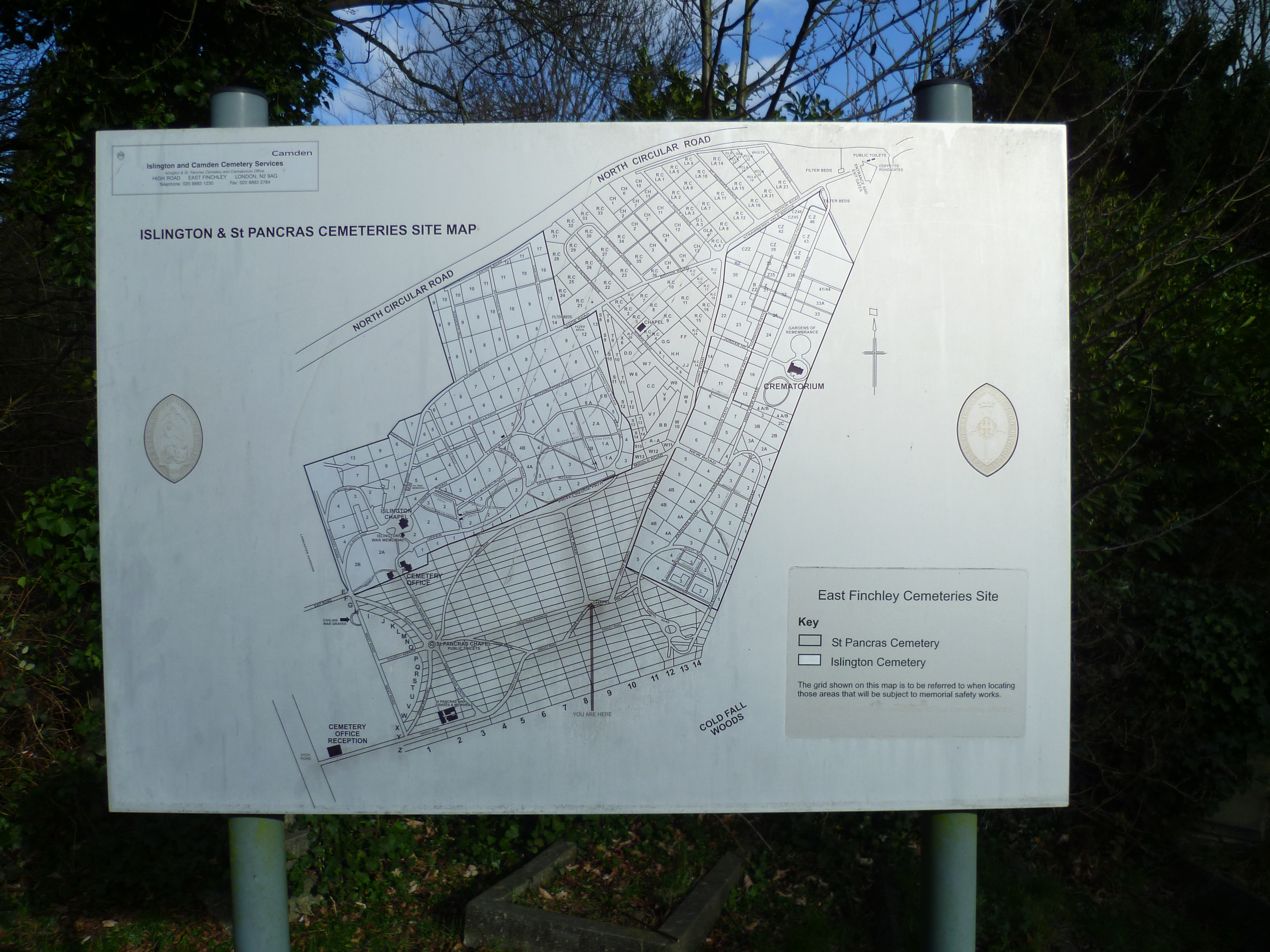
Islington and St Pancras Cemetery site map

=== Origin and development ===
St Pancras and Islington, located in Finchley, is one of London's historically most interesting cemeteries. Following the Metropolitan Burials Act 1852 and later acts which were designed to alleviate serious health and other problems caused by overcrowded burial grounds and lack of management and accountability, the cemetery was established in 1854 as the first municipally owned cemetery in London when the St Pancras Burial Board bought 88 acres (360,000 m^{2}) of the former Horseshoe Farm on Finchley Common. A further 94 acres (380,000 m^{2}) were acquired in 1877 and the total area was divided between Islington and Camden, the former having two areas to the north-west and east, the latter having the remainder. A bank and ditch along the eastern edge marks the parish boundary between Finchley and Hornsey. The cemetery is bordered to the south by the ancient woodland of Coldfall Wood, to the north by the North Circular road, and to the west by the A1000 Great North Road. The cemetery contains several chapels and a large crematorium built by Albert Freeman in 1937.

=== Chapels ===
The St Pancras Anglican chapel (listed grade II) lies at the centre of the semicircular drive which links the entrance and exit to the cemetery, c 250m north-east of the entrance. It was built in 1853 by John Barnett and William C. Birch in a cruciform design, with decorated windows in Gothic style and a central octagonal crossing tower and spire. It was used by both St Pancras and Islington until 1896, when the Islington chapel was built. The Nonconformist chapel was built in the early 1850s by Barnett and Birch and had a six-sided lantern. It was demolished in the 20th century.

The St Pancras Roman Catholic chapel (1896; now demolished) lay on the north side of Roman Road (c 540m north-east of the Islington Anglican chapel), and was in a simple Gothic style. Many of the tombs in the Roman Catholic section are decorated with angels and there are several interesting tombs, including the Melesi Mausoleum of 1914, for an early victim of a car accident.

=== War graves ===
St Pancras Cemetery has a war graves plot containing over 100 graves from both world wars, together with a number of headstones retrieved from graves that were scattered elsewhere in the cemetery and could not be maintained. A memorial bears the names of 27 casualties whose graves could not be marked individually, and of six First World War casualties buried in the adjacent Islington Cemetery who could not be commemorated there. In total 299 First World War Commonwealth service casualties – including one unidentified Royal Navy sailor – and 207 Second World War casualties are commemorated or buried here. Victoria Cross recipients Valentine Bambrick and John Ross are buried here.

Islington Cemetery contains the graves of 334 Commonwealth service personnel of the First and 265 of the Second World War, which are all scattered throughout the cemetery. A Screen Wall memorial in the western part of the cemetery lists names of those buried here whose graves could not be individually marked by headstones, together with those of two servicemen of the Second World War who were cremated at Islington Crematorium. Six soldiers buried in this cemetery whose graves could not be located are alternatively commemorated on stones in St Pancras Cemetery (above).

=== Mausoleums and memorials ===
The grade II listed Mond Mausoleum by Thomas Arthur Darcy Braddell is built in the Grecian style (based on the Temple of Nemesis) in granite and Portland stone, with a pediment supported by two fluted Ionic columns. It was built for Ludwig Mond, a German-born chemist and industrialist.

There is a memorial for William French who died on 13 July 1896 while saving a dog from drowning in one of the Highgate Ponds in North London. The monument was paid for by public subscription.

==== Notable burials ====
- Mathilde Blind German-born English poet, fiction writer, biographer, essayist and literary critic (ashes).
- Ford Madox Brown, Pre-Raphaelite artist.
- Peter Connelly (2006–2007), child abuse victim
- Renato Corsetti (1941–2025), Italian Esperantist who served as President of the World Esperanto Association from 2001 to 2007.
- Cora Henrietta Crippen, wife and victim of notorious murderer Dr. Crippen
- Henry Croft, first "Pearly King". The grave marker is now in the crypt of St Martin-in-the-Fields.
- Margaret Fairchild, subject of The Lady in the Van
- Sir Eugene Aynsley Goossens, violinist and conductor.
- Alice Herz-Sommer, classical pianist, Holocaust survivor and supercentenarian.
- Silas Hocking, prolific Victorian author. Writer of the million-selling novel Her Benny.
- Ben Kinsella, half-brother of actress Brooke Kinsella who was stabbed to death in 2008. His murder prompted changes in approaches towards sentencing for knife crime in Britain.
- Manzi monument by Francesco Nagni: Two bronze angels rising from the grave lifting a man in a neatly buttoned shirt
- John Mayer, classical violinist and Indo-jazz fusion pioneer composer and bandleader.
- Alfred Mond, director of ICI, Liberal MP and Zionist. Son of Ludwig Mond (below).
- Julian Mond, English industrialist, in the family mausoleum
- Ludwig Mond, wealthy industrialist and humanitarian, whose family built a large mausoleum for him.
- Frederic Morgan, 5th Baron Tredegar (1873–1954), Welsh peer and landowner.
- John Morgan, 6th Baron Tredegar (1908–1962), Welsh peer and landowner.
- Tiverton Preedy, clergyman and founder of Barnsley Football Club.
- George Price, American geneticist.
- Percival "Percy" Spencer, Aeronaut, whose memorial originally featured a stone hot air balloon. Nephew of George Spencer (above).
- James Hurst Stead Well known Vaudeville artist of the mid-1800s singer of comedic songs, most notably 'The Perfect Cure' during which he would jump on the spot up to 400 times.
- Olli Wisdom (1958–2021), musician and DJ

==== Reburials from London churchyards ====
- Detached burial ground of St James's Church, Piccadilly after expansion of Euston railway station
- St Pancras Old Church
- St Mary's Church, Islington
- St Luke Old Street
- All Saints Church Poplar

==== Belarusian community burials ====
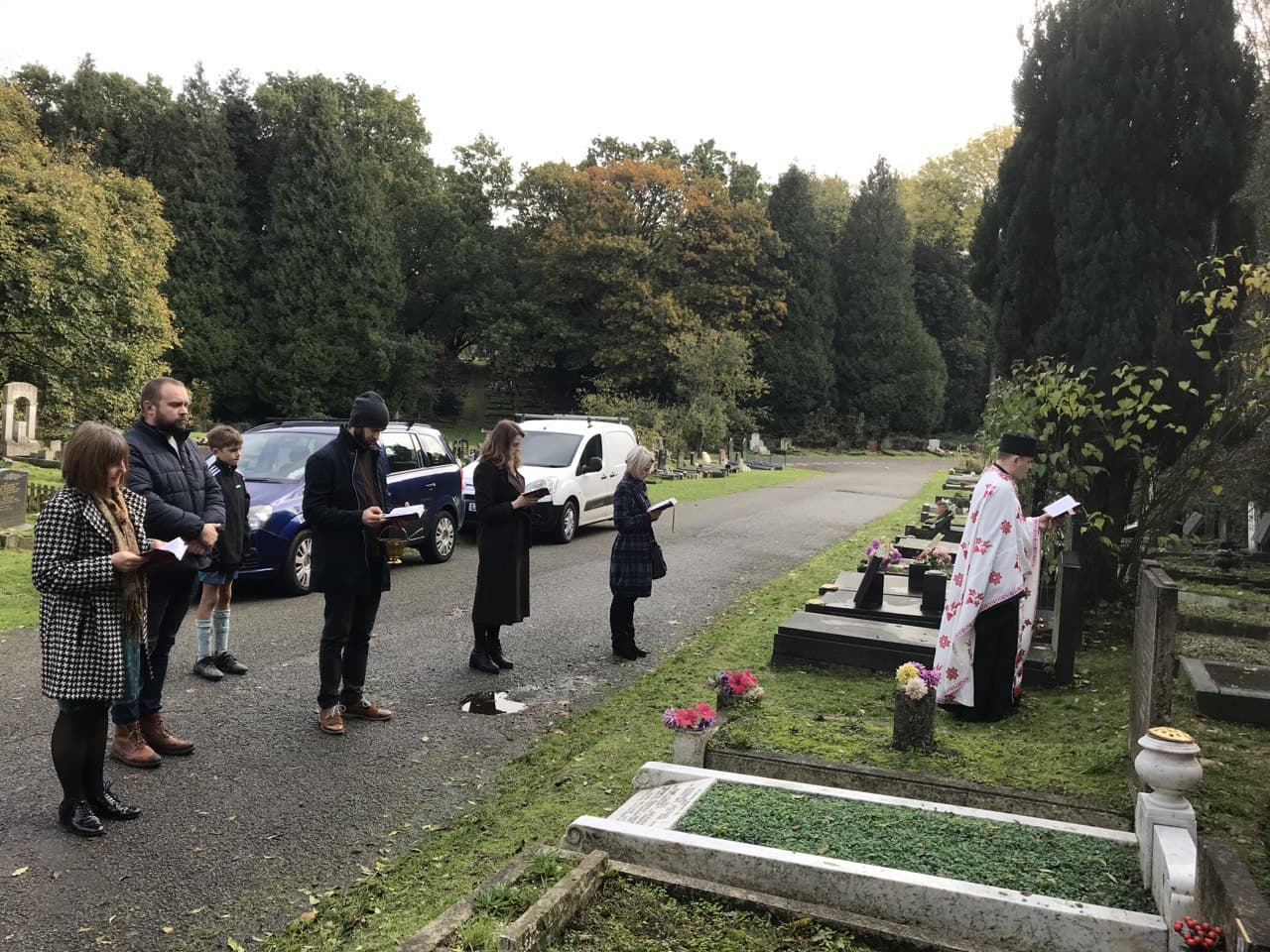
Commemoration of Belarusians buried at the St Pancras and Islington Cemetery on Dziady, 2019

Being close to the Belarusian community centre in North Finchley, including the Francis Skaryna Belarusian Library and Museum and the Church of St Cyril of Turau, St Pancras and Islington Cemetery has become the burial place for a number of exiled Belarusian Catholic priests and notable members of the Belarusian British community, including:

- Bishop Ceslaus Sipovich
- Archimandrite Leo Garoshka
- Fr. Jazep Hermanovich
- Fr. Alexander Nadson
- Paval Navara
- Several leaders and activists of the Association of Belarusians in Great Britain

== Ecology ==
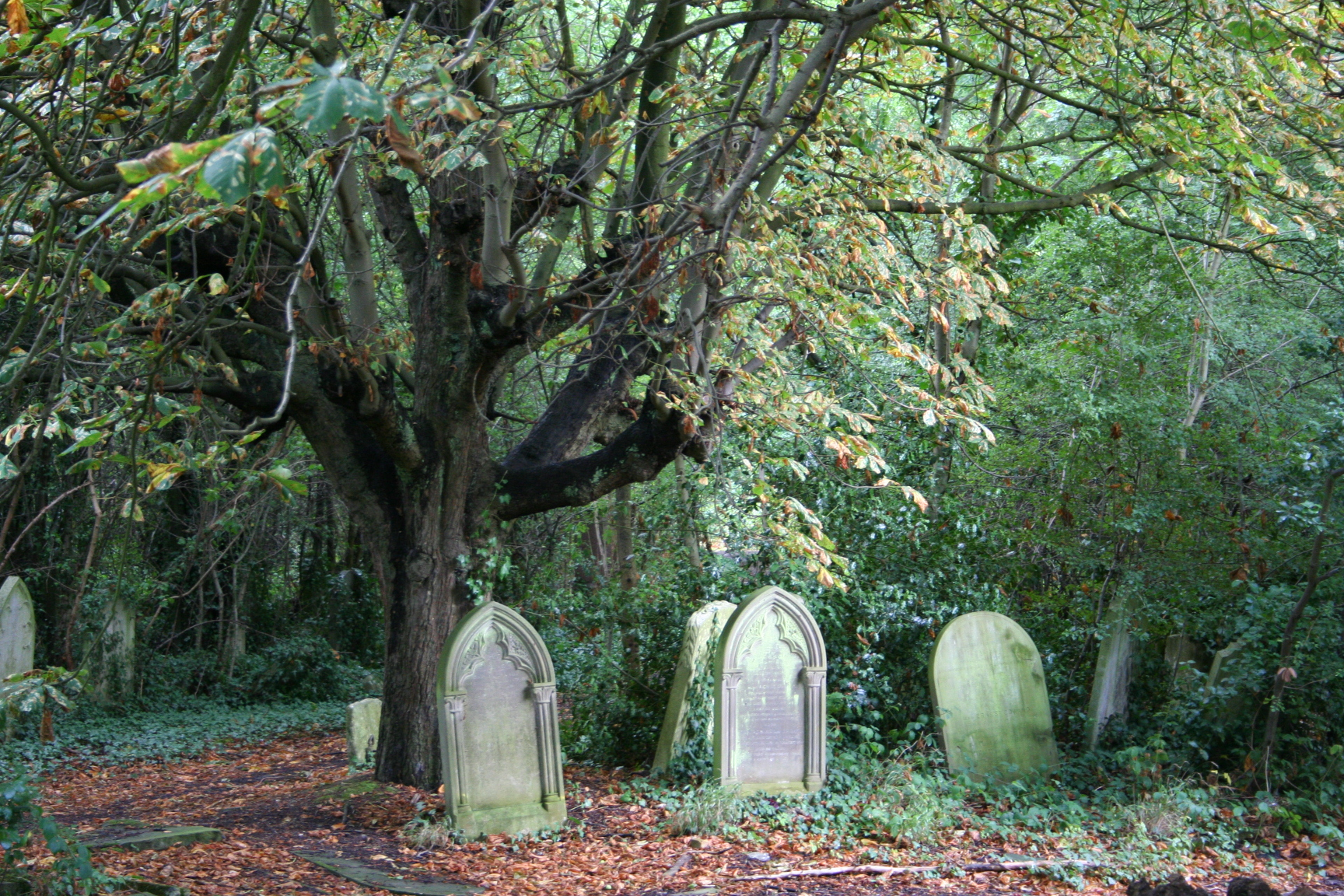
Graves dating from the establishment of the cemetery under a mature horse chestnut which has grown up since

The cemetery has areas of neutral open grassland, wetland and ancient woodland. It is a Site of Borough Importance for Nature Conservation, Grade II.

=== Environmental management ===
The London Ecology Unit has advised the owners on management aimed to conserve natural features, whilst recognising the primary use of the cemetery as a burial ground. In recent years, the managers have permitted natural growth on areas not actively used for burials. The result was a proliferation of natural wildlife, as former burial plots became diverse scrub and secondary woodland.

=== Flora ===
This mixed secondary woodland consists largely of sycamore and ash, with much pedunculate oak, hawthorn and willow. Some exotic ornamental trees have been introduced from time to time, including avenues of limes and horse chestnuts, Lawson's cypress, various pines, yew and monkey-puzzle.

Holly and bramble woodland flora grows beneath the trees and alongside paths, including bluebells, pignut, goldilocks buttercup, cuckoo flower, bugle, and wild strawberry. These have spread from the adjacent woodland, or survived from the cemetery's prior existence as Horseshoe Farm.

In the north-east corner of the cemetery, the Strawberry Vale Brook, culverted for most of its length, emerges into an open course. Wetland habitats here contain mature white willow, rushes, reedmace, marsh thistle, pendulous sedge, and great willowherb.

=== Fauna ===
Birds include green and great spotted woodpeckers, treecreeper and goldcrest and kestrel. Muntjac deer are frequent visitors.

== See also ==
- East Finchley Cemetery
- Nature reserves in Barnet
