= Paval Navara =

- Павал Навара
- Born: September 17, 1927. Kupisk village, Second Polish Republic (now Belarus)
- Died: May 24, 1983 (aged 55); London, UK
- Resting place: St Pancras and Islington Cemetery
- Education: University of London
- Known for: Co-founder of the Anglo-Belarusian Society

Paval Navara (Belarusian: Павал Навара; 17 September 1927 – 24 May 1983), also romanised as Paul Navara, was a Belarusian émigré public figure and co-founder of the Anglo-Belarusian Society.

== Early years ==
Paval Navara was born on 17 September 1927 in Western Belarus, then part of the Second Polish Republic. After secondary school he studied at a teachers college in Navahrudak.

In 1944 at the age of 16, Navara was mobilized into the Nazi army (which occupied Navahrudak at the time) and sent to France where he surrendered to the Allies. Navara joined the Polish II Corps and, after some military training, fought for the Allies in Northern Italy.

== Life in Britain ==
After demobilisation in 1946, Navara settled in the UK and became one of the founders and council members of the Association of Belarusians in Great Britain.

In 1952, he earned a degree in chemistry from the University of London and embarked on a science career.

in 1954, together with Auberon Herbert, he founded the Anglo-Belarusian Society, and in 1969 Navara, Herbert and Ceslaus Sipovich organised a successful fundraising campaign for the Francis Skaryna Belarusian Library and Museum, which allowed the acquisition of a building in North London to house the collection.

== Death ==
Navara died in 1983 at the age of 55. He is buried in St Pancras and Islington Cemetery alongside a number of other notable members of the Belarusian British community.
