= Studitsky =

Studitsky (Russian: Студитский; feminine: Studitskaya) is a Russian surname. Boris Unbegaun writes that it originated in the tradition of the surnames of Russian Orthodox clergy and was given in memory of Saint Theodore the Studite. Notable people with the surname include:

- Aleksandr Studitsky (1908-1991), Soviet histologist, doctor of biological sciences, Stalin Prize recipient
- Fyodor Studitsky (1814-1893), Russian educator and folklorist
- Vasily Studitsky (born 1961), Russian and American biologist
