= Andrej Aliaksandraŭ =

Belarusian journalist

- Андрэй Аляксандраў
- Born: 27 January 1978 (age 48); Nizhny Tagil, USSR
- Education: Polack State University, University of Westminster
- Occupation: journalist

Andrej Valerievich Aliaksandraŭ (Belarusian: Андрэй Валер’евіч Аляксандраў, transliteration in official documents: Andrei Aliaksandrau; born 27 January 1978) is a Belarusian journalist, activist and political prisoner.

== Early life and career ==
Aliaksandraŭ was born in Nizhny Tagil (the Russian Soviet Federative Socialist Republic). He moved to Belarus as a child with his family. He went to school in Pastavy and read History and Philology at the Polack State University.

He went on to study at the University of Westminster where he earned a degree in Media Management. While in London, he joined the Association of Belarusians in Great Britain and was actively involved in the activities of the Belarusian diaspora in the UK.

In 2009–12, he was a deputy chair of the Belarusian Association of Journalists and worked for Index on Censorship and Article 19. In 2015–18, Aliaksandraŭ was a deputy director of BelaPAN, the only independent of the government news agency in Belarus.

Aliaksandraŭ is a keen supporter of Liverpool FC.

== 2020 activism and imprisonment ==
Between August and November 2020 Aliaksandraŭ and his partner Iryna Zlobina were involved in the work of “BY_help”, a crowd-funding platform. The platform was set up to assist participants in the anti-Lukashenka's protests with finding the money to pay administrative fines imposed on them by the Lukashenka regime.

They were arrested on 12 January 2021 and charged with “Training and other preparation of persons for participation in public actions which seriously violate public order, as well as the financing and other aiding of such actions”. Recipients of BY_help's assistance were also charged with criminal offences and required to pay fines once again with their own funds.

On 18 January 2021 Aliaksandraŭ and Zlobina were declared political prisoners by human rights organisations which explained that freedom of assembly is guaranteed by the Constitution of Belarus and international law and that:

“the arrangement of payment of fines imposed on persons brought to administrative responsibility […] and the costs of their imprisonment in detention facilities have nothing to do with the financing of mass riots or other group actions that grossly violate public order: the suspects did not pay for any criminal acts, did not promise advance payments to persons on the conditions of committing actions covered by […] the Criminal Code, did not participate in their preparation (training or other material support)”.

On 30 June 2021 Aliaksandraŭ was charged with high treason (Article 356-1 of the Criminal Code). If found guilty under this article, he may face up to 15 years of imprisonment.

On 6 October 2022, the Minsk Regional Court sentenced Aliaksandraŭ to 14 years in prison. Also sentenced were Zlobina and two other Andrei's colleagues, Irina Leushina and Dzmitry Navazhylau.

On 16 September 2026, Aliaksandraŭ and Zlobina were released from prison and deported to Lithuania, along with 24 other political prisoners, following months of talks between the Belarusian government and John Coale, the United States' special envoy to Belarus.
