= Ann Pennington =

Ann Pennington may refer to:

- Ann Pennington (actress) (1893–1971), popular stage star of the 1910s and 1920s
- Ann Pennington (model) (born 1950), model who posed for Playboy
- Anne Pennington (1934–1981), British philologist
