= Faulstich =

Faulstich is a surname. Notable people with the surname include:

- Edith Margaret Faulstich (1907–1972), American philatelist and philatelic journalist
- Gerhard Faulstich, German baritone
- Marga Faulstich (1915–1998), German glass chemist
- Martin Faulstich (born 1957), German research scientist
- Nikolaus Faulstich (1837–??)
- Peter Faulstich (1946–2016)
- Werner Faulstich (1946–2019)
