= Helen Michaluk =

Belarusian émigré (1930–2022)

Helen Michaluk (Belarusian: Алена (Лёля) Міхалюк, née Marcinkevich; 15 May 1930 – 16 October 2022) was a prominent figure of the Belarusian diaspora, a long-standing (and the only female) head of the Association of Belarusians in Great Britain.

== Life and work ==
Michaluk was born in the village of Lonskija, Braslaŭ County in the north-east part of the Second Polish Republic (now Sharkawshchyna District of Vicebsk Region, Republic of Belarus). She went to a Polish and then – Belarusian school.

In 1947, she settled in the United Kingdom and, two years later, married Janka Michaluk. She became a member of the Association of Belarusians in Great Britain and the Anglo-Belarusian Society; she was also actively involved with St Cyril of Turaŭ Belarusian school in London and the Belarusian Autocephalous Orthodox Church.

In 1982, Michaluk became a member of the Rada of the Belarusian Democratic Republic. In 1997, she was elected the chair of the Association of Belarusians in Great Britain – the position she held until 2013.

Michaluk died on 16 October 2022, at the age of 92, and is buried in Manchester Southern Cemetery.

== Awards ==
In 2019, Michaluk was awarded a Belarusian Democratic Republic 100th Jubilee Medal for her contribution to Belarusian public life in the diaspora.
