= Alan Flowers =

British scientists

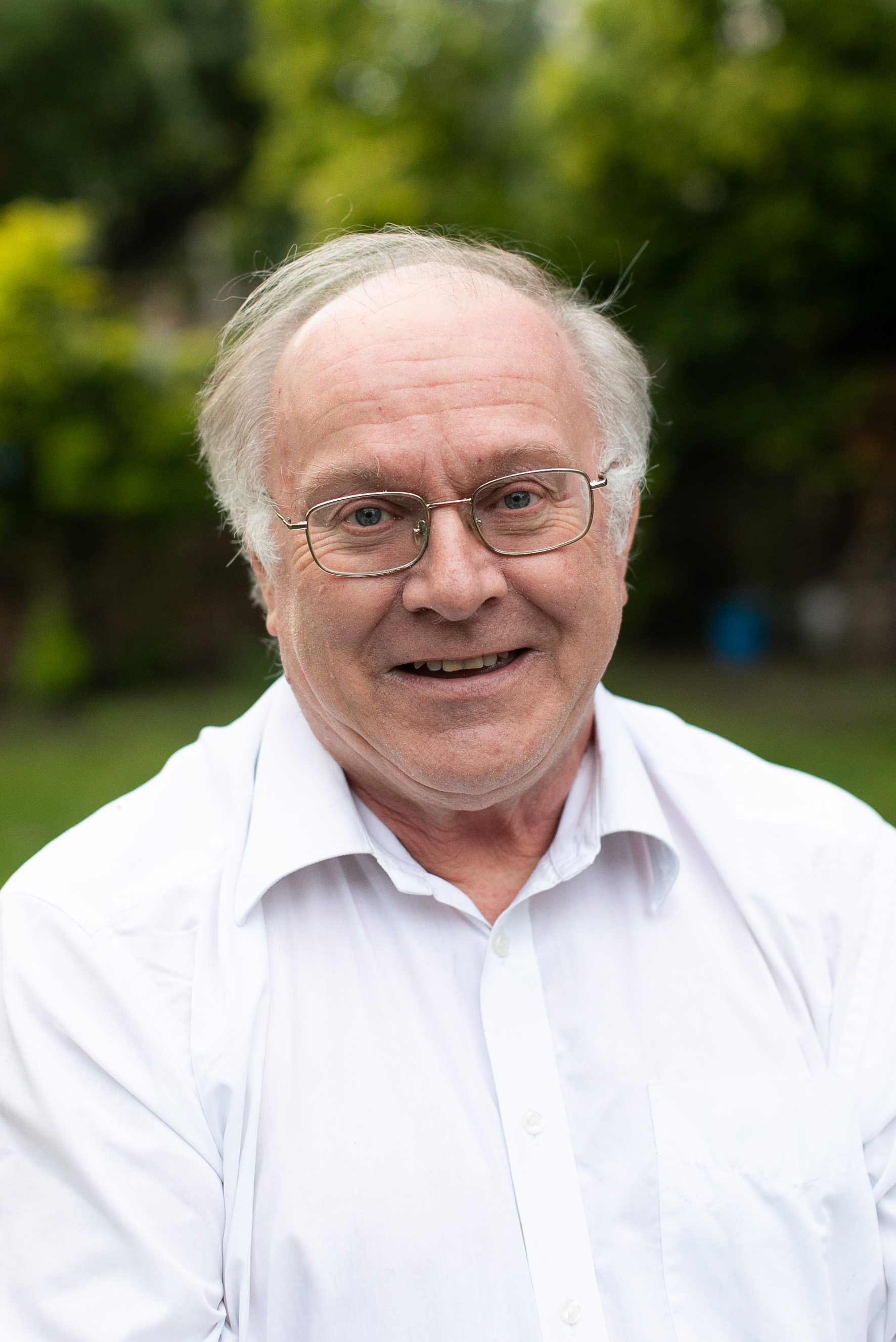
- Flowers in 2021
- Born: May 3, 1953 (age 73); Liverpool, England
- Education: University of Edinburgh
- Known for: studying the Chernobyl nuclear disaster
- Scientific career
- Fields: Radioecology
- Workplaces: Kingston University London

Alan flowers British Scientist

Alan Flowers (born 3 May 1953) is a British scientist studying the Chernobyl nuclear disaster, environmental and human rights activist, promoter of Belarusian culture in the UK and the chair of the Anglo-Belarusian Society.

== Early years and academic career ==
Flowers was born in Liverpool to Scottish parents but moved to Edinburgh as a child. He went to the University of Edinburgh where he earned a PhD in 1980. From 1985 until his retirement in 2017 Flowers worked at Kingston University London in different positions.

Flowers has dedicated much of his academic career to working on educational initiatives and research projects examining the widespread impact of the 1986 Chernobyl explosion – the worst nuclear accident in history. He worked closely with academics from Belarus in the immediate years after the disaster and has more recently collaborated with experts from Ukraine.

He led the academic cooperation between Kingston University London and what later became the International Sakharov Environmental Institute in Minsk between 1992 and 2004. In 2002 this university awarded him an Honorary Doctorate in Radioecology.

== Activism and promotion of Belarusian culture ==
Flowers was “introduced to Belarus, Belarusians in Britain and the Anglo-Belarusian Society by Vera Rich, in 1992, in connection with his academic interests in Chernobyl.

In 1998 he founded the Belarus country organisation of the pan-European youth NGO “European Youth Parliament (EYP)”, and facilitated its parliamentary debate educational activities from then until 2014, and retains an active interest in EYP.

Since 1995 he has enabled a wide range of cultural visits to the UK by Belarus theatres, artists and musicians, mainly to several Edinburgh Fringe Festivals.

In 2004, Flowers was placed on the Belarusian KGB's "forbidden persons list" and banned from entering the country. While no official explanation was provided, the deportation was believed to be caused by his contacts with non-government groups in Belarus and his investigation of “high probability” claims that the Soviet Union's government deliberately seeded radioactive clouds to make them rain on South-Eastern Belarus in 1986.

Flowers is the current chair of the Anglo-Belarusian Society and has actively supported the 2020-2021 Belarusian protests.
