= Martin Faulstich =

German research scientist

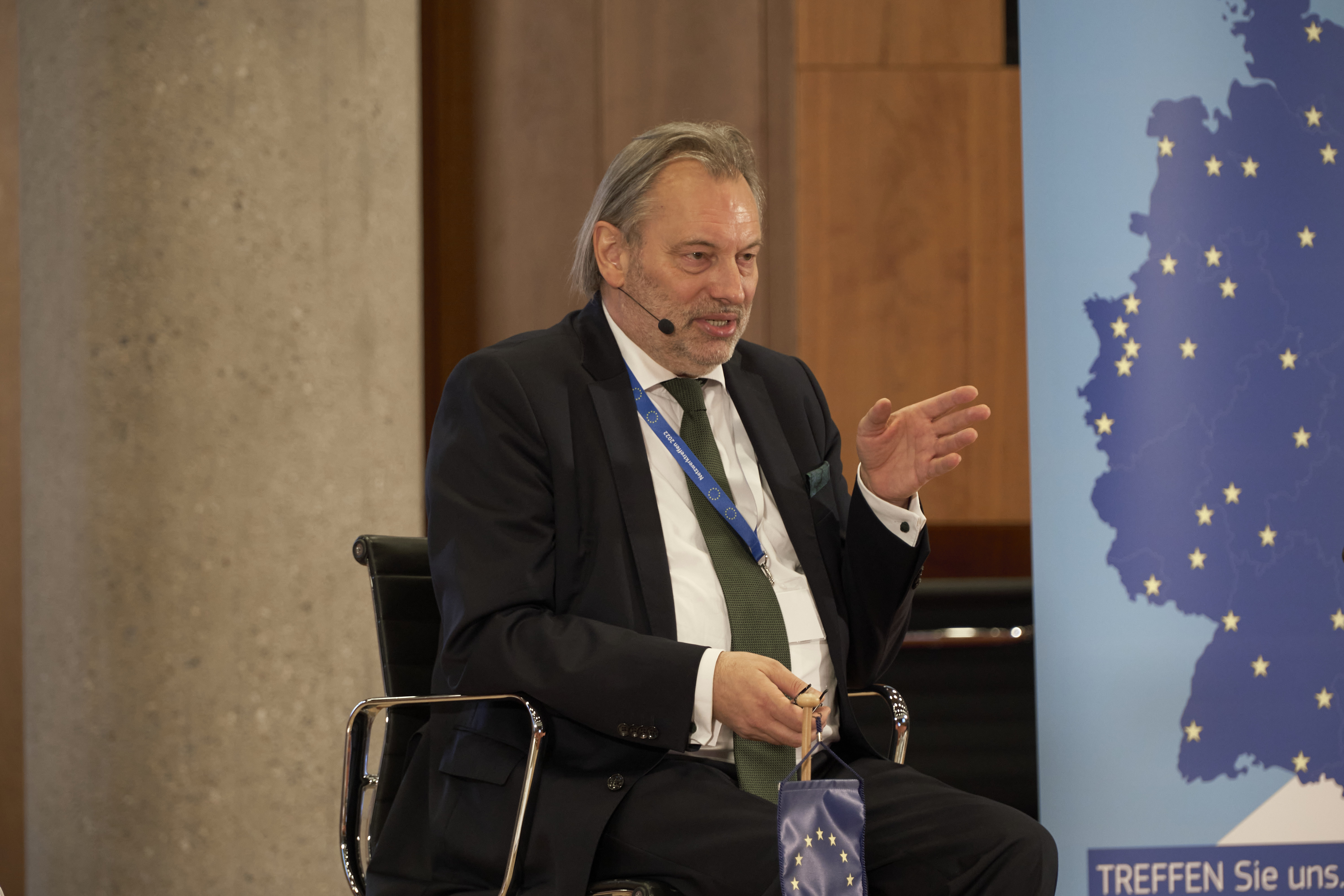
Martin Faulstich

Martin Faulstich (born 13 July 1957 in Hagen, Germany) is a German research scientist. He is a professor at the Clausthal University of Technology, chairman of the German Advisory Council on the Environment and the managing director of the Clausthal Institute of Environmental Technology (CUTEC) in Clausthal-Zellerfeld.

== Academic career ==
After studying Mechanical Engineering and Process Engineering in Düsseldorf and Aachen, Martin Faulstich earned his doctorate in Environmental Engineering at Technische Universität Berlin in 1992. In 1994 he was appointed as Professor of Waste Management at the Technical University of Munich in Garching. During 2003 to 2012, Martin Faulstich was the chair holder for Resource and Energy Technology. At the same time he was the founding director of the Science Center Straubing.

During 2000 to 2012 he served as the executive and scientific director of the ATZ Development Center in Sulzbach-Rosenberg. Since 2013 he is the chair professor at the Environmental and Energy Engineering Department of Clausthal University of Technology and the managing director of the Clausthal Institute of Environmental Technology (CUTEC). In 2014, Faulstich was appointed as the research coordinator for Energy Systems and Process Energy Technology at the Energy Research Centre of Niedersachsen.

Martin Faulstich has been the chairman of the German Advisory Council on the Environment (SRU) since 2008 in which, he is a member since 2006. He is also a member of several other boards of trustees and advisory boards including the Ifo Institute for Economic Research, the Potsdam Institute for Climate Impact Research, the International Sakharov Environmental University, the Academy for Spatial Research and Planning (ARL), the Environment and Water Research Institute (NEWRI, Nanyang Technological University Singapore) and the International Scientific Board of the AdMas Center (Brno University of Technology, Czech Republic).

== Research ==
The focus of Faulstich’s work is on strategies and policies for sustainable industrial society. His faculty is involved with analysis of technical value chains, development of processes targeting at the generation and use of renewable raw materials and energy (such as hydrogen, methane, methanol) and also with focus on investigations on recycling processes of secondary raw materials from residues of fermentation and combustion processes (metals, phosphorus).

== Current positions ==
- Professor at the Chair of Department of Environmental and Energy Engineering, Clausthal University of Technology
- Managing director of the CUTEC - Clausthal Institute of Environmental Technology GmbH
- Chairman of the German Advisory Council on the Environment, Berlin
- Research area coordinator for Energy Systems and Process Energy Technology of the EFZN - Energy Research Centre of Niedersachsen

== Most important awards ==
- Urban Mining Award 2014 for science and technology in the scope of the 5th Urban Mining Congress
- Cultural Award 2010 of Sulzbach-Rosenberg
- Environmental Price 2008 of E.ON AG Bayern (received together with Prof. Dr.-Ing. Karl Sommer)
- Most-Read Expert Award 2007 of the online knowledge-portal ask-eu.de
- Bavarian Pilot Project Award 2003, Environmental Competence Centre
- Innovation Award Berlin Brandenburg 1992

== Publications (selection) ==
- Esther Müller, Lorenz M. Hilty, Rolf Widmer, Mathias Schluep, Martin Faulstich: Modeling Metal Stocks and Flows: A Review of Dynamic Material Flow Analysis Methods. In: Environmental Science & Technology 48, Issue 4, (2014), 2102–2113, doi:10.1021/es403506a.
- Bernd Rohowsky, Thomas Häßler, Arne Gladis, Edgar Remmele, Doris Schieder, Martin Faulstich: Feasibility of simultaneous saccharification and juice co-fermentation on hydrothermal pretreated sweet sorghum bagasse for ethanol production. In: Applied Energy 102, (2013), 211–219, doi:10.1016/j.apenergy.2012.03.039.
- Michaela Kolb, Volker Sieber, Manfred Amann, Martin Faulstich, Doris Schieder: Removal of monomer delignification products by laccase from Trametes versicolor. In: Bioresource Technology 104, (2012), 298–304, doi:10.1016/j.biortech.2011.11.080.
- H. Höfling, A. Leipprand, M. Sterner, N. Gerhardt, C. Pape, Y.-M. Saint-Drenan, M. Faulstich, O. Hohmeyer: 100 % regenerativ – Wie lange vertragen sich konventionelle und erneuerbare Energien auf dem Weg zur komplett regenerativen Stromversorgung? In: BWK Das Energie-Fachmagazin, Band 62, Heft 10, 2010, S. 14–19 (PDF).
- J. Ellenrieder, D. Schieder, W. Mayer, M. Faulstich: Combined mechanic-enzymatic pretreatment for an improved substrate conversion when fermenting biogenic resources In: Engineering in Life Sciences, Vol. 10, No. 6, 2010, pp. 544–551, doi:10.1002/elsc.201000078.
- M. Mocker, M. Köglmeier, A. Leipprand, M. Faulstich: Perspektiven für eine ressourceneffiziente Industriegesellschaft. In: Chemie Ingenieur Technik, Band 82, Heft 11, 2010, S. 1881–1891, doi:10.1002/cite.201000125.
- D. Bendix, G. Tegeder, P. Crimmann, J. Metschke, M. Faulstich: Development of thermal sprayed layers for high temperature areas in waste incineration plants. In: Materials and Corrosion, Vol. 59, No. 5, 2008, pp. 389–392, doi:10.1002/maco.200804120.
- G. Weber-Blaschke, R. Mosandl, M. Faulstich: History and Mandate of Sustainability. From Local Forestry to Global Policy. In: P. A. Wilderer, E. Schroeder, H. Kopp (Ed.): The Sustainability Axiom in the Light of the World Cultures. Wiley Publishers, Weinheim 2005, pp. 5–19
- O. Christ, P. A. Wilderer, M. Faulstich: Mathematical Modelling of the hydrolysis of anaerobic processes. In: Water Science and Technology, Vol. 41, No. 3, 2000, pp. 61–65 (Abstract)
