= Anglo-Belarusian Society =

British organisation to study Belarus

The Anglo-Belarusian Society (Belarusian: Ангельска-беларускае таварыства, romanized: Anhielska-biełaruskaje tavarystva) is one of the oldest Belarus-related organisations in the UK with an object of “diffusion, interchange and publication of knowledge relating to the Belarusian people, their land, history and culture”.

== History ==
Originally a part of the Association of Belarusians in Great Britain, the Society was established on 16 March 1954 using contacts within British political and academic circles developed by the Belarusian community in the early 1950s. At the height of the Cold War, there was a growing interest in British Belarusians as representatives of one of the Captive Nations.

The founders of the Society were Auberon Herbert and Pavel Navara.

Auberon Herbert also became the first acting chairman. The first president of the Society was David Ormsby-Gore. A long-serving President of the Society was Frances Ward (Lady Phipps), wife of Eric Phipps. Another woman who was actively involved in the Society was Katharine Macmillan, a vice-chairman of the Conservative Party in 1968. She served first as the organisation's Vice President and then President.

The Society, despite its "Anglo-" label, was by no means intended to exclude Scotland, Wales and other parts of the UK.

Among the early cultural activities of the Society was the publication of a regular pamphlet on Belarus and the organisation of concerts of Belarusian church chants, folk songs and dances in Westminster Cathedral Hall in 1950s.

In 1965 the Society began publishing the Journal of Belarusian Studies, with an introduction by Prof. Robert Auty. The Journal was distributed annually to universities, libraries and private subscribers in the UK, the US, the Soviet Union and other countries throughout the world. As well as articles on Belarusian literature, linguistics, history and art, each number of the Journal included book reviews, a chronicle of current events, and a comprehensive bibliography for the preceding year. A booklet “An Introduction to Byelorussia” was also published by the Society in 1965.

For many decades, the Society and the Journal have provided a development platform for a number of prominent scholars of Belarusian studies and researches of Belarusian culture, including Guy Picarda, Vera Rich, Arnold McMillin, Jim Dingley, Bishop Ceslaus Sipovich, Fr Alexander Nadson, Peter Mayo and others.

== Present day ==
The Society remains a leading organisation promoting Belarusian culture and studies in the UK. Its present-day activities include among others:

- annual commemoration of the International Mother Language Day with poetry recitals, etc;
- annual celebration of the Kupala Night;
- annual Batlejka performance over the Christmas period;
- ad hoc concerts, recitals, performances and other events.

Dr Alan Flowers is the current chair of the Society.

== Image gallery ==
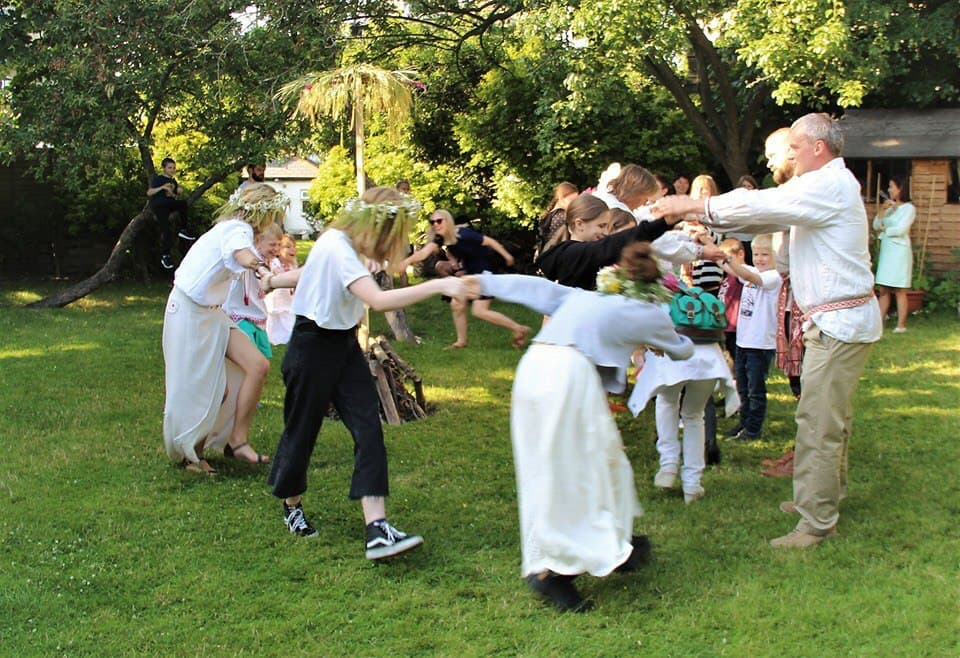
Kupala Night in London, June 2019

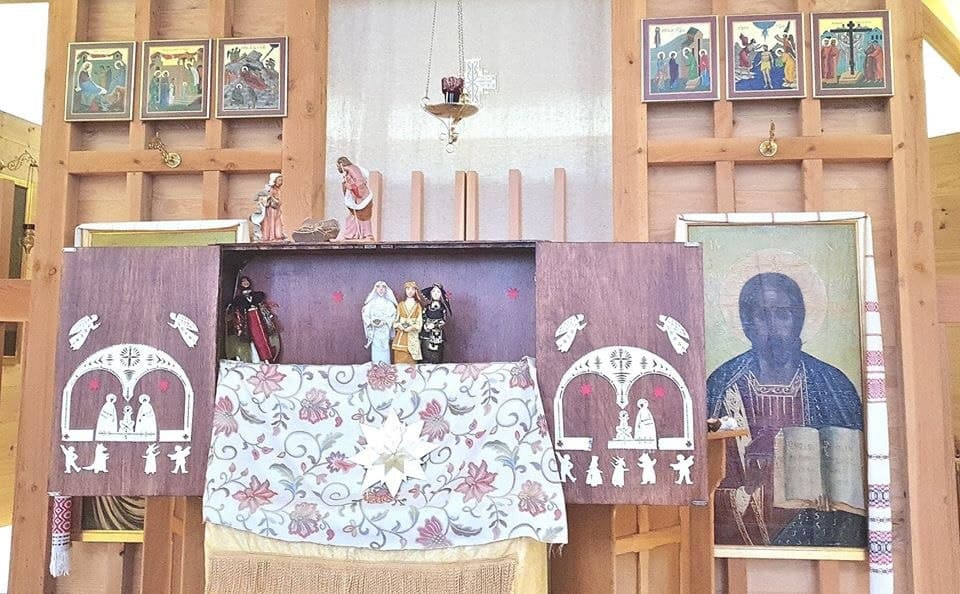
Batlejka in the St Cyril Church, December 2019

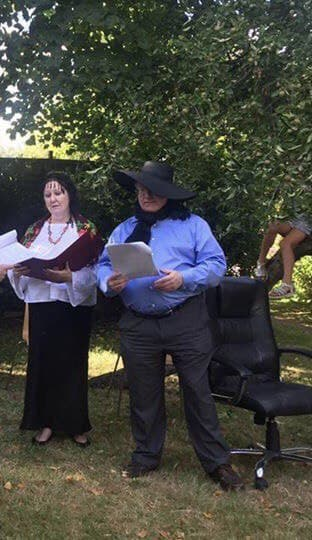
Alan Flowers taking part in the performance of Pinskaja Šliachta, July 2017

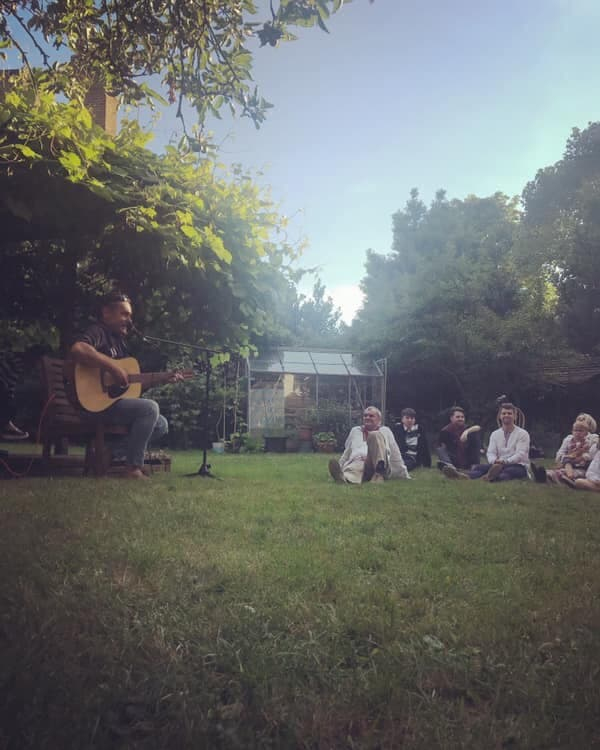
Concert of Belarusian singer Źmicier Vajciuškiévič, London, summer 2019

== See also ==
- Association of Belarusians in Great Britain
- Francis Skaryna Belarusian Library and Museum
- Professional Union of Belarusians in Britain (PUBB)
- Belarusians in the United Kingdom
