= Villa Beatrice =

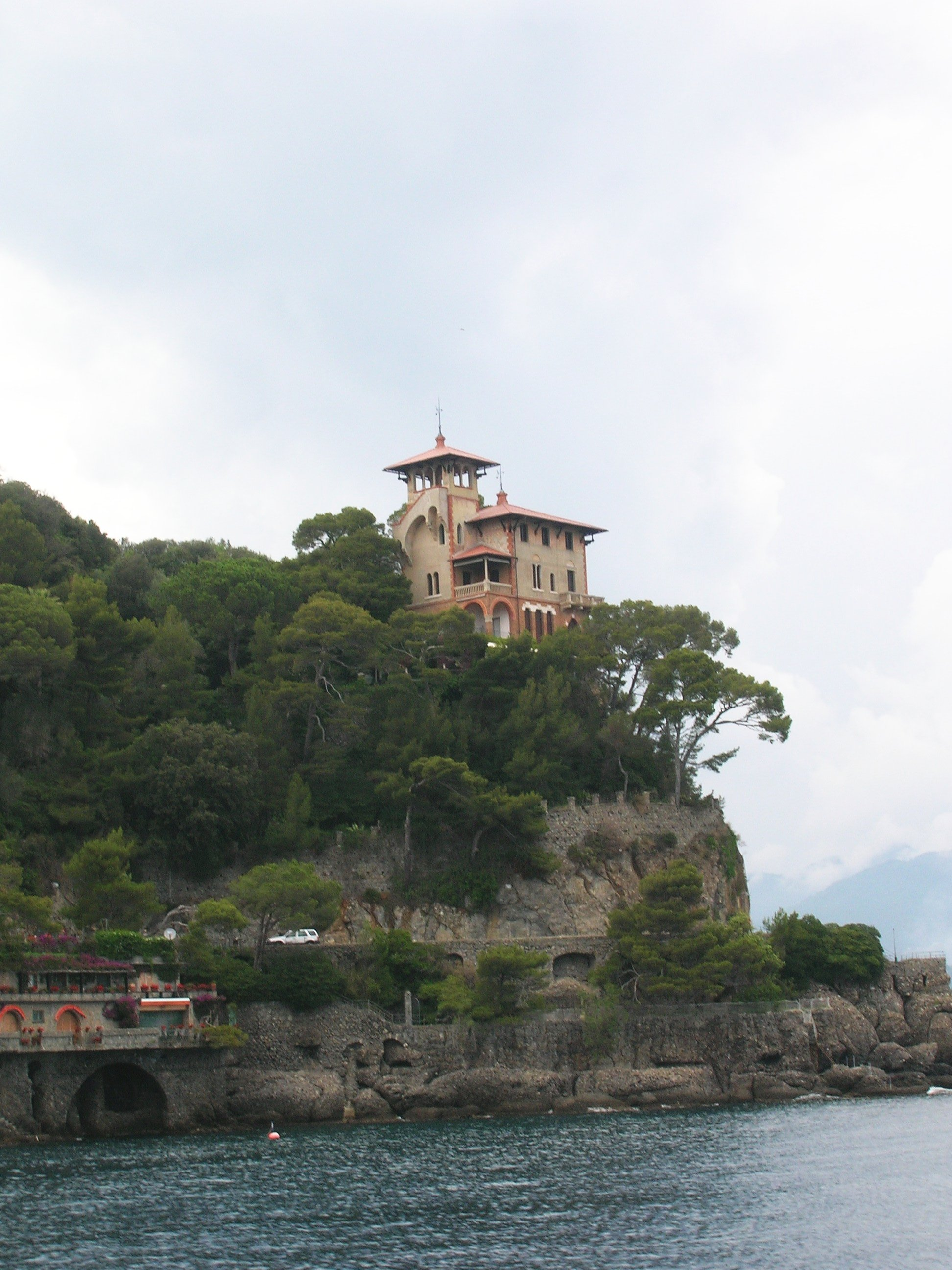
- Villa Beatrice in 2007
- Click on the map for a fullscreen view

General information
- Location: Portofino, Italy
- Coordinates: 44°18′22.02″N 9°12′48.86″E

Villa Beatrice is a historic villa located in Portofino, Italy.

== History ==
The villa, designed by architect Gino Coppedè, was built around 1913 by Attilio Odero, a senator and entrepreneur in the shipbuilding industry. After World War II, the residence passed to Enrico Piaggio, Elena Odero's son, and later to the Tonolli and Costa-Ardissone families.

The property was acquired in 2021 by the international hospitality company Belmond Limited.

== Description ==
The villa is located in a panoramic position overlooking the sea on the Punta Cajega promontory and it has a large garden surrounded by the Portofino Regional Natural Park, established in 1935.

The villa, which features an eclectic style inspired by Neo-Gothic architecture, resembles a castle. The building, spread over four levels, incorporates a tower. Loggias, protruding balconies, and biforas are among the decorative elements. The façades are finished in stone, decorated plaster with colorful tiles, and white cement.

== Gallery ==
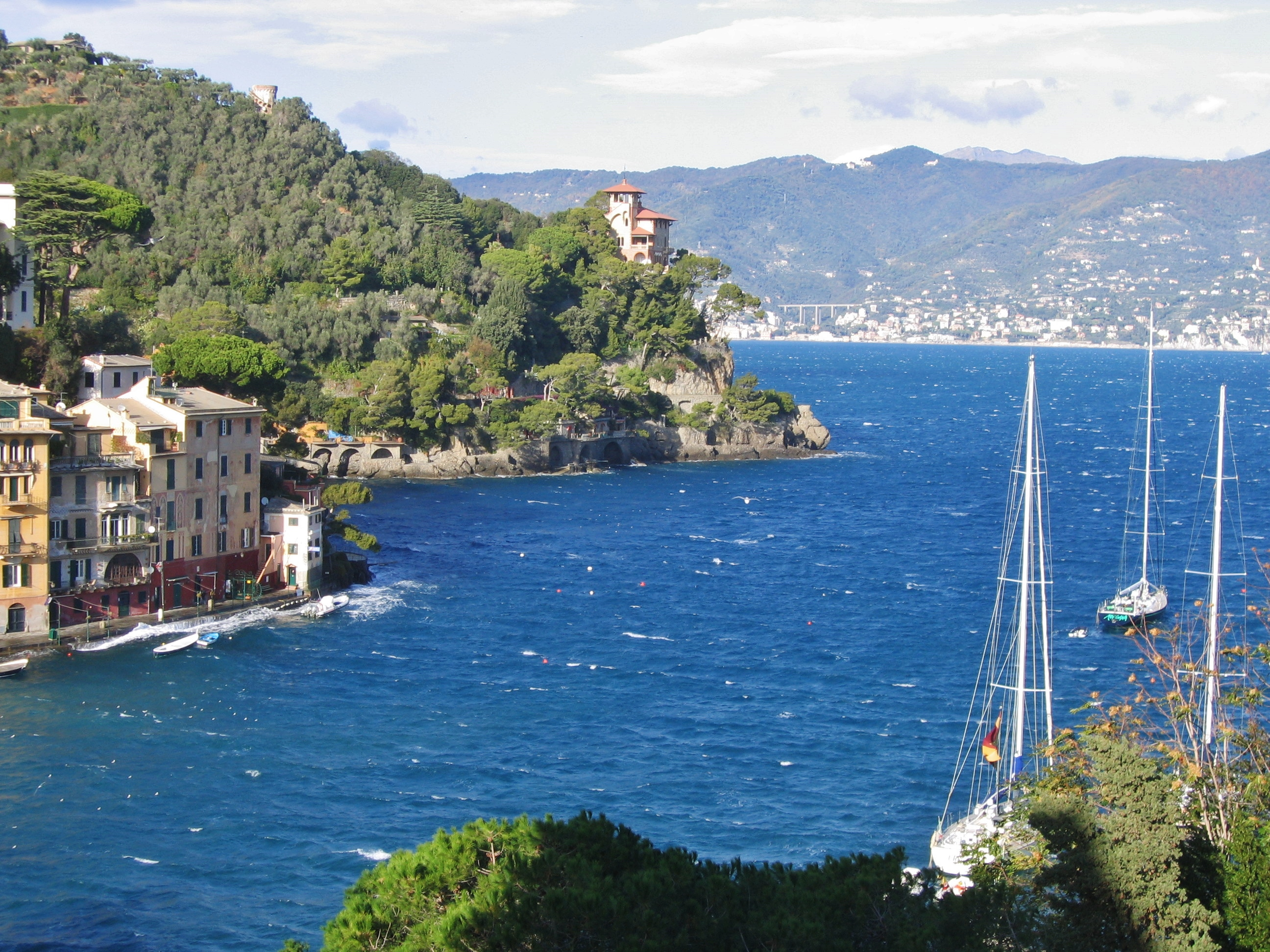

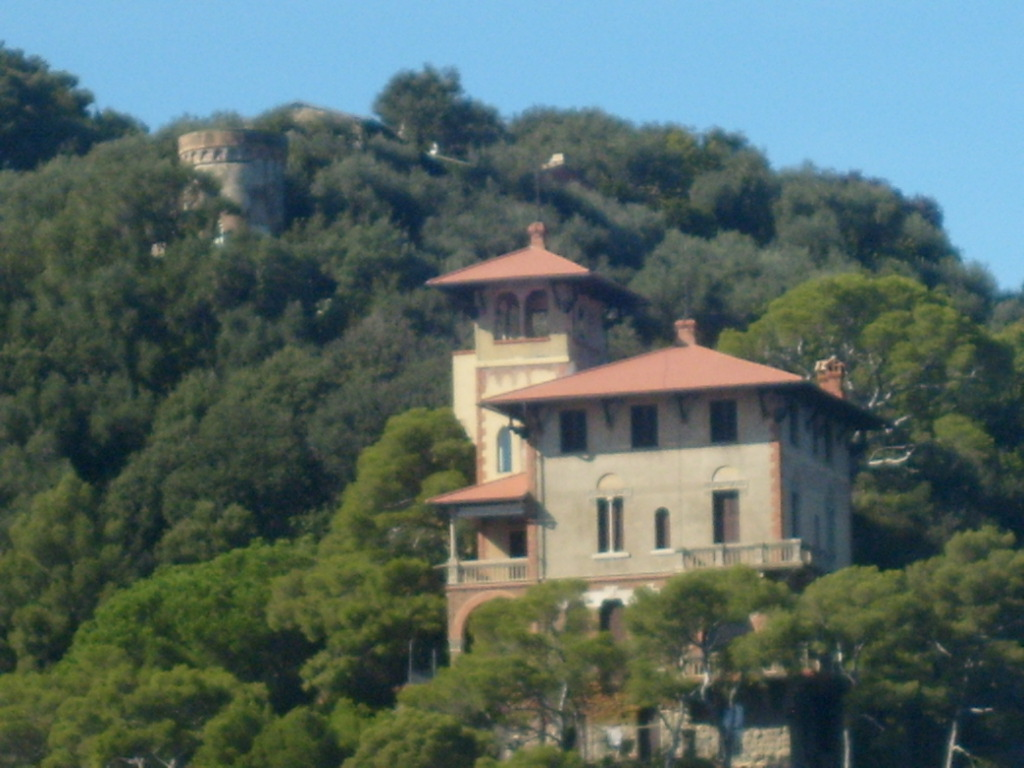

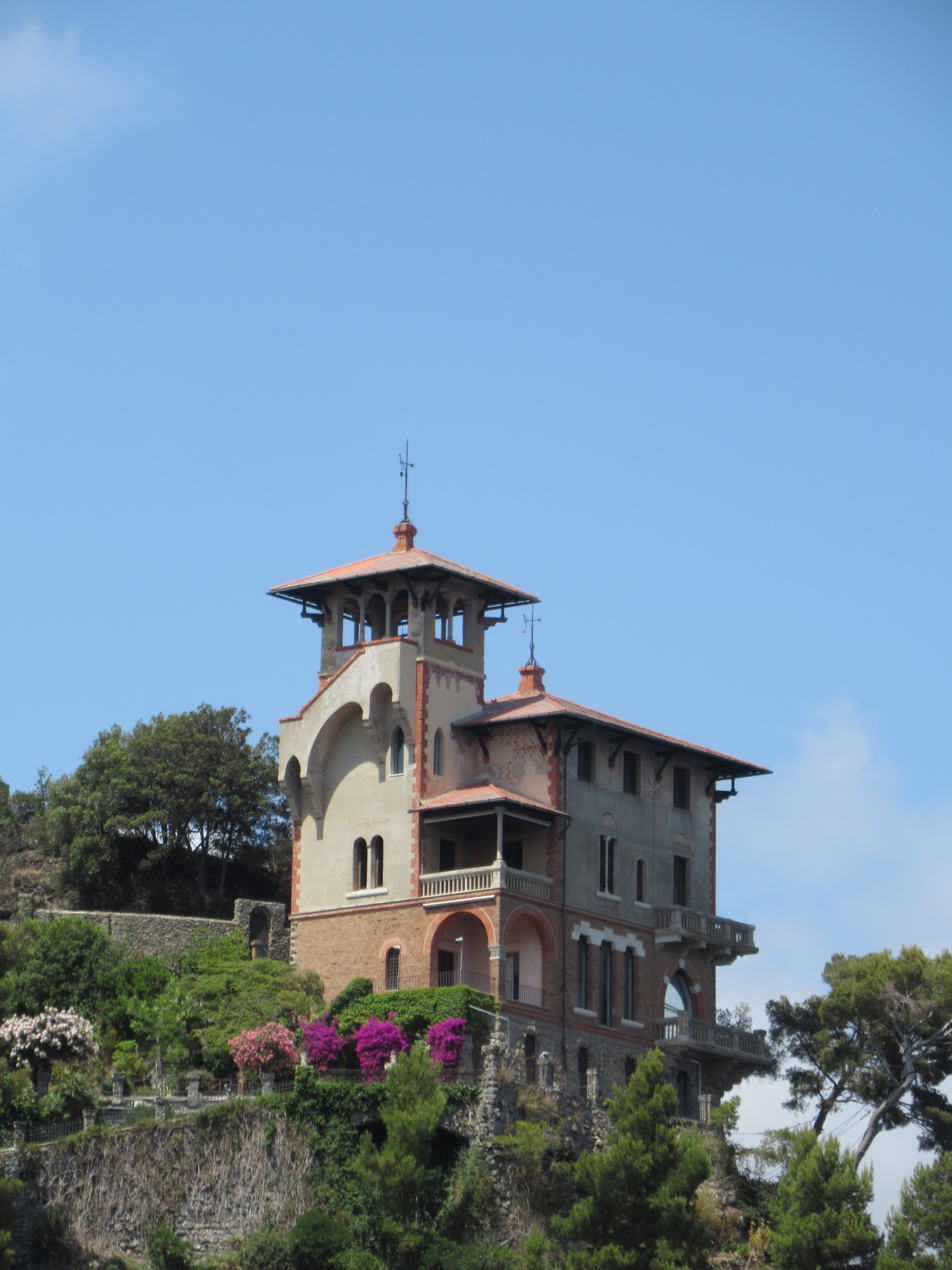

== See also ==
- Villa Altachiara
