= International Congress of Slavists =

The International Congress of Slavists is a Slavist quinquennial gathering for the humanities and social sciences. The first Congress was held in 1929 in Prague.

Forty countries worldwide are represented. Their chairs are members of the International Committee of Slavists (ICS), responsible for organizing the International Congress.

There are 2 parts in the Presidium.

- Full Presidium: 6 members from Slavic countries, and 6 members from non-Slavic countries.
- Reduced Presidium: current Slavic host country, immediately previous Slavic host country, an additional Slavic country, a non-Slavic country.

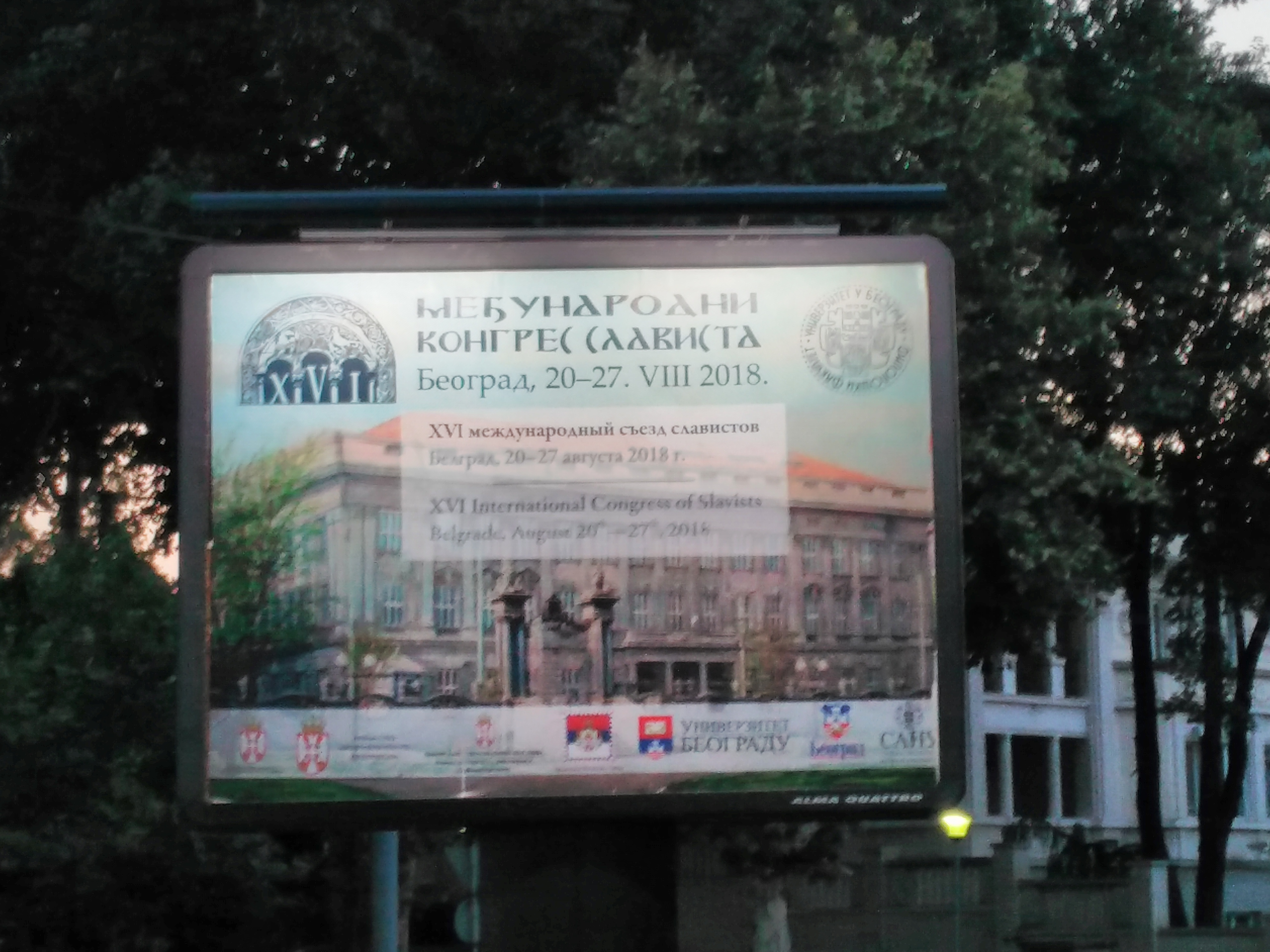
2018 Congress in Belgrade

== See also ==
- Slavic studies
