= Robert Auty =

English philologist (1914–1978)

Robert Auty, FBA (10 October 1914 – 17 August 1978) was an English philologist who specialised in Slavonic languages.

== Early life and education ==
Robert Auty was born on 10 October 1914 in Rotherham to George Auty, a schoolmaster. His sister Phyllis was a Slavist and historian who worked at the University of London and was then the professor of modern history at Simon Fraser University from 1974 to 1978. He attended Rotherham Grammar School before reading modern and medieval languages at Gonville and Caius College, Cambridge, under E. K. Bennett; he placed in the first class in both parts of the Tripos, graduating in 1935. Choosing to focus on German, he then completed doctoral studies at the University of Münster under the supervision of Günther Müller; the PhD was awarded in 1937.

== Career ==
In 1937, Auty was appointed an assistant lecturer in German at the University of Cambridge. From 1939 to 1943, he worked for the Czechoslovak Government in Exile and then spent the rest of the Second World War working in the Foreign Office. Though he had already studied the Czech language before the war (and had been impressed by Norman Brooke Jopson's lectures on Old Church Slavonic), his war work left him with an interest in Slavonic studies which overtook his earlier work on German. He returned to the University of Cambridge in 1945 and was appointed to a university lectureship in German, which he held until 1962 but the title was changed to include German and Czech in 1948, and to be Lecturer in Slavonic Studies in 1957. In 1950, he was also elected a fellow of Selwyn College. In 1962, Auty moved to the University of London to take up the Professorship of Comparative Philology of the Slavonic Languages. He remained there for three years, before in 1965 he become Professor of Comparative Slavonic Philology at the University of Oxford, which came with a fellowship at Brasenose College. The author of over two dozen articles, his only book was Handbook of Old Church Slavonic, Part II: Texts and Glossary, which was published in 1960.

Auty retained his chair until his death on 18 August 1978. He had received the Czechoslovak Academy's Josef Dobrovský Gold Medal in 1968 and been elected a corresponding member of the Austrian Academy (1975) and a fellow of the British Academy (1976). He received the DLitt from Oxford.

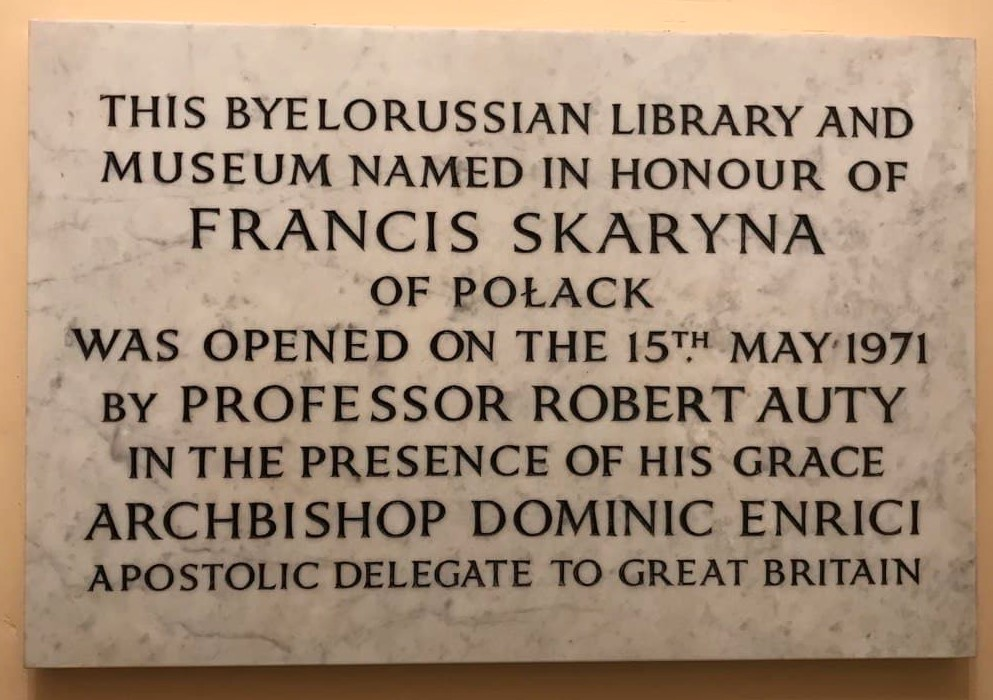
The plaque at the entrance of Francis Skaryna Belarusian Library and Museum commemorating its opening by Prof. Robert Auty in 1971

Auty was an active promoter of Belarusian studies in the UK who also inspired other British academics, such as Arnold McMillin, to engage in this field. In 1965 he became one of the founders of the Journal of Belarusian Studies writing an introduction about "a little-known East European people and its contribution to civilisation". In 1971 he opened the Francis Skaryna Belarusian Library and Museum, one of the largest Belarusian libraries outside Belarus – an event commemorated by a plaque bearing Auty’s name at the library’s entrance.

Academic offices
Preceded by Grigore Nandriș	Professor of Comparative Philology of the Slavonic Languages, University of London; 1962 to 1965	Unknown
Preceded by Boris Unbegaun	Professor of Comparative Slavonic Philology, University of Oxford; 1965 to 1978	Succeeded by Anne Pennington
