= Grigory Kotoshikhin =

Russian diplomat and writer

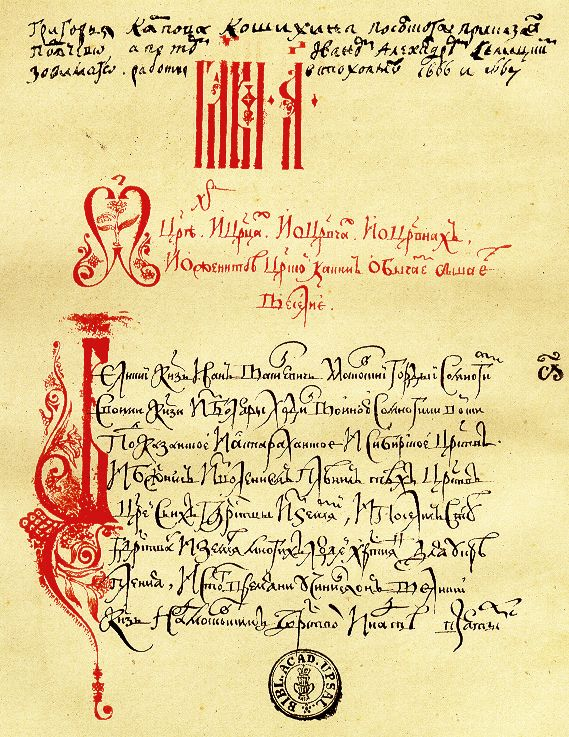
Manuscript of Kotoshikhin's book

Grigory Karpovich Kotoshikhin (Russian: Григорий Карпович Котошихин) (c. 1630 – November 1667) was a Russian diplomat, podyachy of the Posolsky Prikaz, and writer.

In 1658–61, Grigory Kotoshikhin was one of those sent on a diplomatic mission to negotiate the Treaty of Valiesar and Treaty of Cardis with Sweden. In the spring of 1664, he was dispatched to see Prince Yakov Cherkassky and take charge of his army's clerical work. In August, however, Grigory Kotoshikhin defected to the Lithuanians and moved to Silesia. After that, he went to Stockholm via Narva and was admitted to the Swedish service. Kotoshikhin converted from Orthodoxy to Lutheran Protestantism and adopted the name Ivan-Alexander Selitsky. In the fall of 1667, he was executed at Stockholm for killing, while drunk, the owner of the house where he had been living.

Grigory Kotoshikhin authored a work called On Russia during the Reign of Alexey Mikhailovich, which represents a valuable source of history of the mid-17th century Tsardom of Russia. It was first published by Ja. Berednikov (St Petersburg, 1840); a modern diplomatic edition with extensive linguistic commentary was published in 1980 by Anne Pennington.
