= Villa Altachiara =

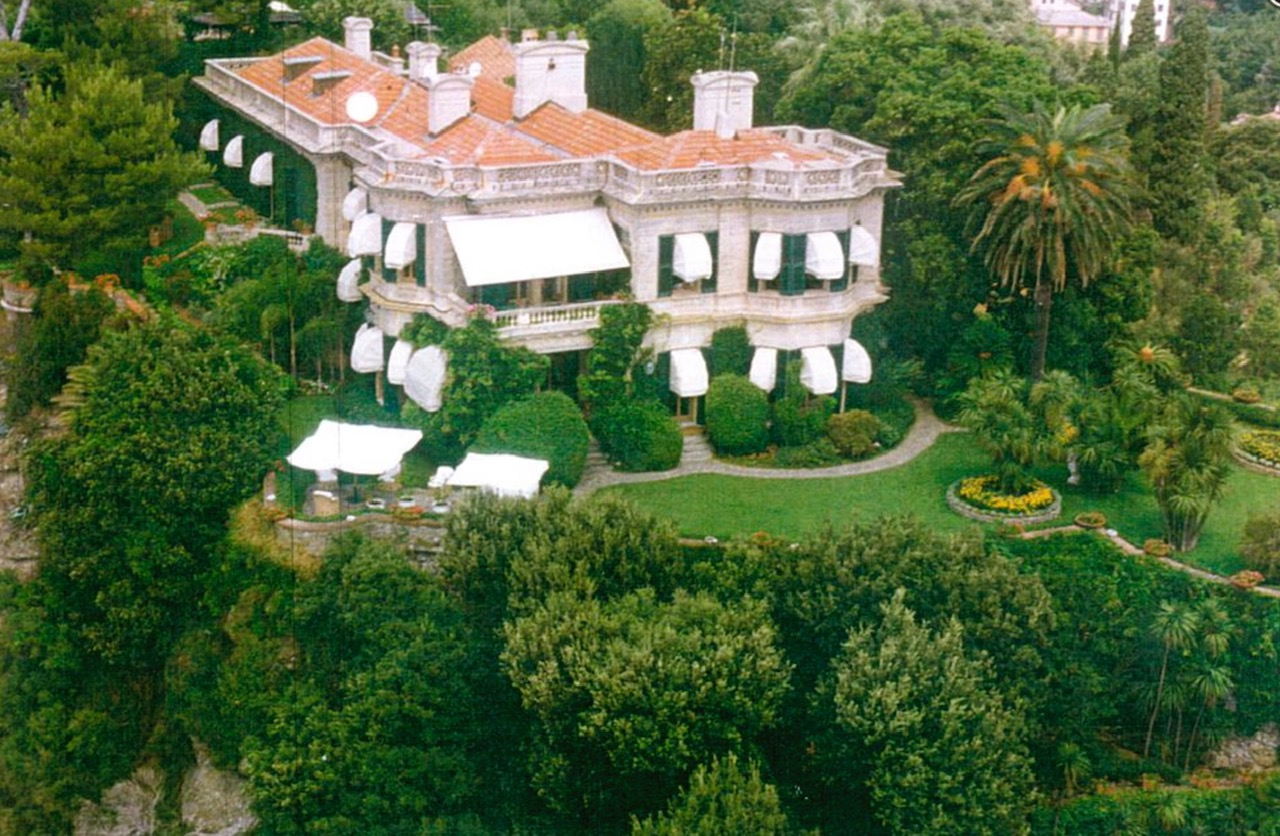
- Villa Altachiara in Portofino
- Click on the map for a fullscreen view

General information
- Location: Portofino, Italy
- Coordinates: 44°18′06.47″N 9°12′32.2″E

Villa Altachiara (or Villa Carnarvon) is a historic cliffside villa located in Portofino, Italy.

== History ==
The villa was built in 1874 on behalf of Henry Herbert, 4th Earl of Carnarvon for his young son George Herbert, Lord Porchester, who suffered from poor health and needed sunshine and sea. George, who succeeded his father as the Fifth Earl of Carnarvon, is known for having funded the expedition that discovered the tomb of Tutankhamun in 1922. Alta Chiara was an Italian rendering of 'Highclere', the English seat of the Earls of Carnarvon.

Following his death the house passed into the ownership of his widow Elizabeth "Elsie" Herbert, Dowager Countess of Carnarvon. Elsie entertained "eminent folks from the world of politics, religion (mainly Catholic, of course) and science". She continued to occupy the Villa until her death in 1929; she bequeathed the property to her grandson Auberon Herbert, who was the eldest son of her late son The Hon. Aubrey Herbert. Aubrey declared: "if a man can have a second country, Italy is my second country".

The house became "a veritable literary colony for poets, painters and writers", including Aubrey's son-in-law Evelyn Waugh, Alfred Duggan, Peter Acton and Brooke Astor. The house was where the novelist Evelyn Waugh met his second wife, Auberon's sister Laura Herbert, in 1937. The Waughs regularly stayed at Altachiara during their marriage.

In late 1938 the Villa was advertised as being for rent for £60 a month from 1 June 1939; the property then contained 10 bedrooms, 3 bathrooms and 3 reception rooms. Auberon Herbert sold the villa to an Italian industrialist in October 1961. The body of a later owner of the property, Contessa Francesca Vacca Graffagni Agusta, was found on the shoreline near the property in January 2001.

== Description ==
The villa, located on a steep cliff overlooking the Mediterranean, features a Victorian style. The stone façades are characterized by large windows and terraces.

== Gallery ==
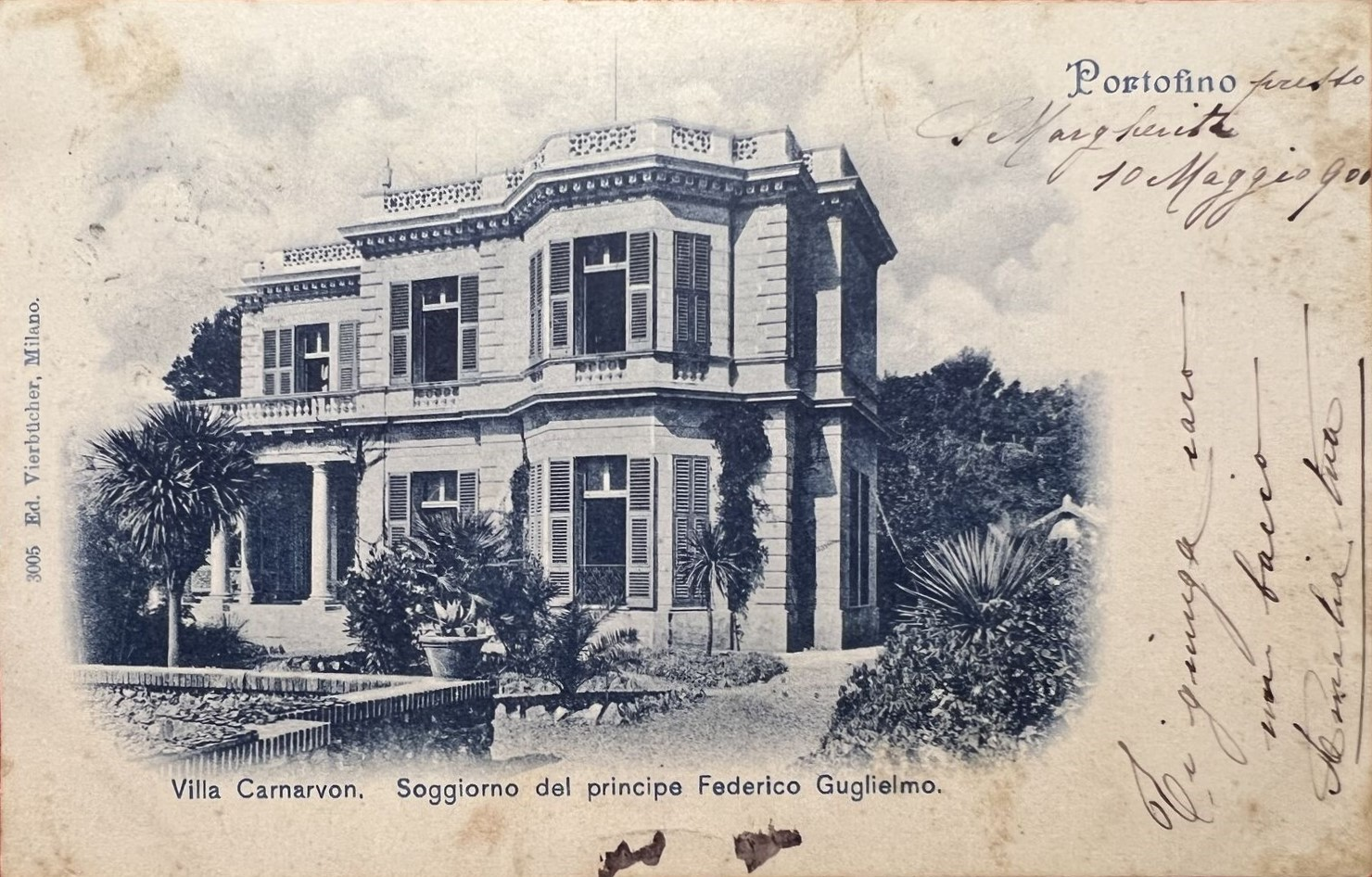
'Villa Carnarvon', from a postcard made before 1900. Prince Frederick William of Prussia (d.1888) stayed there near the end of his life

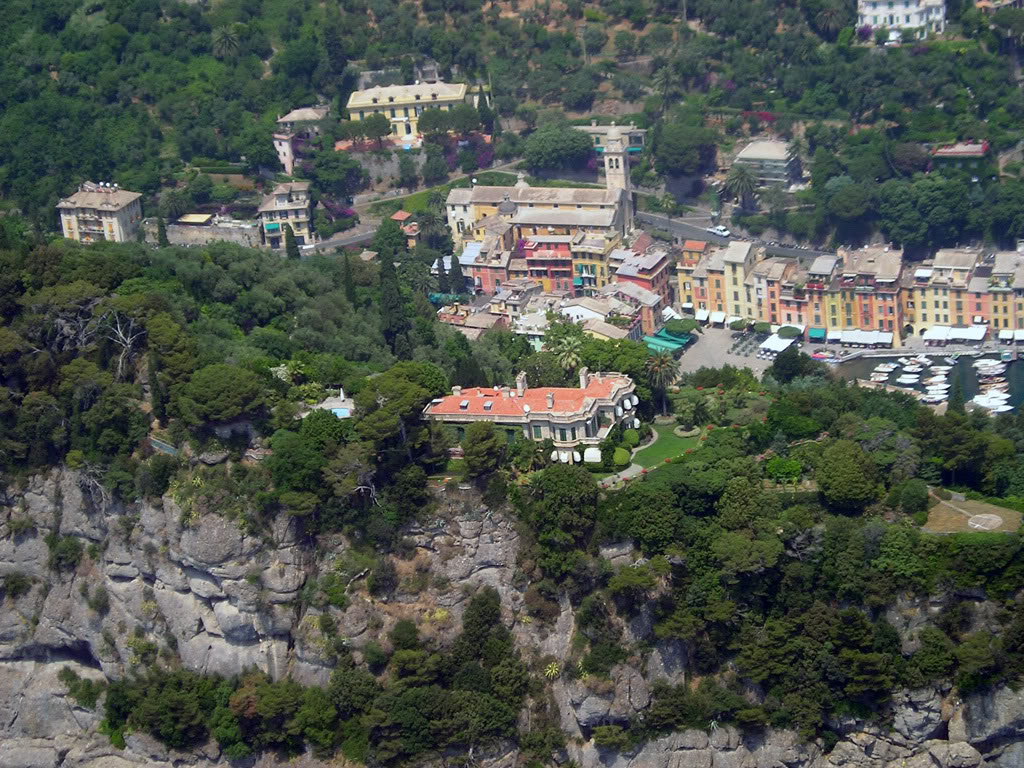
View of the setting

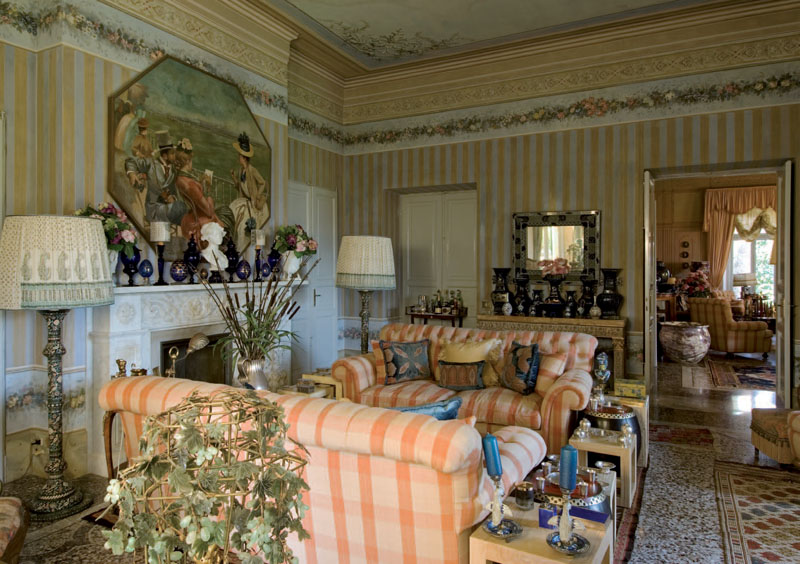
The interior decorated by Renzo Mongiardino

== See also ==
- Villa Beatrice
