= John Ross (VC) =

Recipient of the Victoria Cross

- John Ross VC
- Born: c. 1822; Inch, Scotland
- Died: 23 October 1879 (aged 56–57); London, England
- Burial place: St Pancras and Islington Cemetery
- Military career
- Allegiance: United Kingdom
- Branch: British Army
- Rank: Sergeant
- Units: Royal Sappers and Miners
- Conflicts: Crimean War
- Awards: Victoria Cross; Médaille militaire (France)

John Ross VC (c. 1822 – 23 October 1879) was a Scottish recipient of the Victoria Cross, the highest and most prestigious award for gallantry in the face of the enemy that can be awarded to British and Commonwealth forces.

== Details ==
Ross was about 33 years old, and serving as a corporal in the Corps of Royal Engineers, British Army, in the Crimean War, when he undertook the actions for which he later was awarded the VC.

On 21 July 1855 at Sebastopol, Crimean Peninsula, Corporal Ross went out at night in charge of a working party of 200 men each carrying an entrenching tool and a gabion, and before morning they had connected the 4th parallel right attack with an old Russian rifle-pit in front. On 23 August the corporal was in charge of the advance from the 5th parallel right attack on the Redan in placing and filling 25 gabions under a very heavy fire. Again, on 8 September he crept up to the Redan at night and returned to report its evacuation, bringing with him a wounded man.

In addition to the Victoria Cross, Ross was awarded the French Médaille militaire.

He later achieved the rank of sergeant.

He died in London on 23 October 1879, and was buried at St Pancras and Islington Cemetery.

== Victoria Cross medal ==
His Victoria Cross is displayed at the Royal Engineers Museum in Chatham, Kent.
