= Auberon Herbert (landowner) =

Auberon Mark Yvo Henry Molyneux Herbert (1922–1974) was a British landowner and advocate of Eastern European causes after World War II.

Herbert was the son of Aubrey Herbert, Member of Parliament (MP), who died the year after his birth, and brother-in-law of the famous novelist, Evelyn Waugh. He was named after his great-uncle, the Voluntarist philosopher, and in a gesture of familial reconciliation, the Waughs named their son after him.

Herbert attended Ampleforth College from 1934 to 1940 and Balliol College, Oxford from 1940 to 1942. After the Second World War broke out he made repeated attempts to serve, but was rejected by the British Army, the Free French and the Dutch forces in Britain. He was finally accepted by the Polish Army in Britain. He fought throughout the Normandy Campaign. In 1944, while he was on a personal mission from Winston Churchill in Belgium, he was arrested by Canadian military police in a bar in Ghent, on suspicion of being a spy. His eccentric appearance and manner, and his proficiency at languages, had aroused their suspicion. He was badly beaten and received lasting facial scars.

After the war Herbert was unsuccessful in his attempts to enter Parliament. He supported various Eastern European anti-Communist groups, helped to resettle Polish refugees and financed a textile mill to employ Polish exiles. His assistance extended to Ukrainian and Belarusian groups. He was a founder and chairman of the Anglo-Belarusian Society and a parishioner of the Belarusian Eastern Rite Catholic Church in Finchley and was described as "the man who started British-Belarusian collaboration". He authored several reports on the Anglo-Belarusian Society activities between 1965 and 1971.

A recently released CIA document names a "Mr. Herbert AUBERON of 11 Neville Terrace, London, SW 7" as one of two representatives of the British Conservative Party who met the Ukrainian nationalist leader Yaroslav Stetsko in early 1951.

Herbert opposed Evelyn Waugh's marriage to his sister Laura Herbert, and Waugh never forgave him. An unflattering portrayal of a brother-in-law, "Boy" Mulcaster, featuring some of Herbert's characteristics appears in Waugh's novel Brideshead Revisited.

Despite high intelligence and a circle of distinguished friends (including Isaiah Berlin and Malcolm Muggeridge), Herbert seemed unable to accomplish as much in his life as he hoped. Being the only son, he inherited the family's country home of Pixton Park, near Dulverton in Somerset and the Villa Alta Chiara (an Italian rendering of "Highclere", the English seat of the Earls of Carnarvon) at Portofino in Italy, built by his grandfather the 4th Earl, which features in Waugh's Sword of Honour trilogy.

Herbert died a bachelor at the age of 52. His estate was probated at (GB)£895,722.
