= Anne Pennington =

British philologist (1934–1981)

- Born: 31 March 1934; Herne Bay, United Kingdom
- Died: 27 May 1981 (aged 47); Oxford, United Kingdom
- Occupation: Professor of Slavic studies
- Predecessor: Boris Unbegaun

Anne Elizabeth Pennington (31 March 1934 – 27 May 1981) was a British philologist specialising in Slavic studies. She was particularly interested in songs as well as the development of the language.

== Life ==
Penninngton was born on 31 March 1934 to Janet Winifred (née Aitken) and Alan Mather Pennington. Her father was a manufacturer and her mother was a teacher. She was born at their home in Pigeon Lane in the seaside town of Herne Bay. She went to Simon Langton Girls' Grammar School before joining Lady Margaret Hall where she studied French and Russian and in 1955 she earned a first class degree from the University of Oxford. She had also met Boris Unbegaun who was to be her mentor and she followed in a similar field of study. She continued at Oxford and in 1959 Lady Margaret Hall made her a fellow. The following year she was a lecturer as she studied the development of the Slavonic languages.

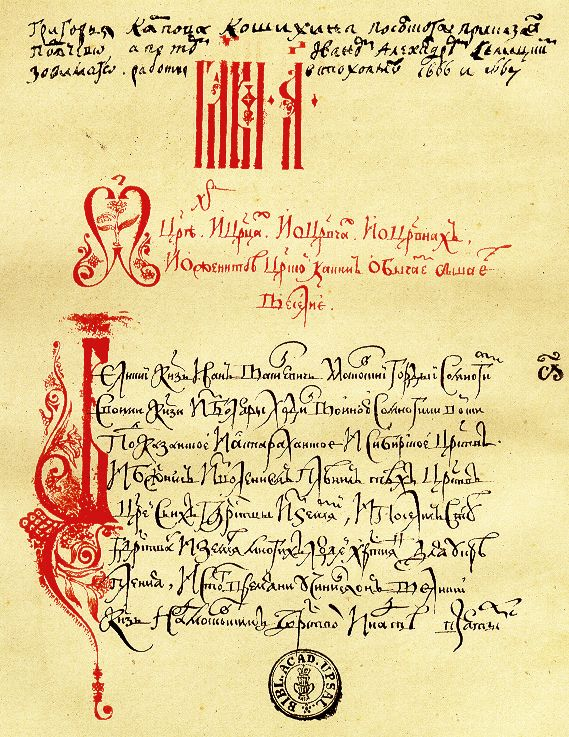
Manuscript of Kotoshikhin's book

Her research focused on an account of Russia written by Grigory Kotoshikhin in 1666. 298 years after that account was written, Pennington was awarded a DPhil for her thesis on Kotoshikhin, in 1964.

In 1980 she became a Professor holding the chair in Slavonic philology that had belonged to Robert Auty and once to her mentor, Boris Unbegaun. Pennington frequently visited the Balkan Slav states although her studies included Bulgaria, Poland and what was then Yugoslavia and Czechoslovakia. She would record songs, learn dances and collect cultural items such as clothing and jewellery. Later she would translate songs and poems.

She was known for finding unknown works by Stefan the Slav. She had an interest in music and she joined an Eastern Orthodox choir in Oxford. Academically she studied fifteenth century Serbian church singing and discovered the pronunciation norm.

Her translation of Collected Poems of Vasko Popa was reviewed with favour by premiere literary critic John Bayley of Oxford University in The New York Review of Books. Her translation was selected for "The Persea Series of Poetry in Translation," general editor Daniel Weissbort, with an introduction by Ted Hughes. In the review, the Oxford don Bayley wrote that Popa was "one of the best European poets writing today."

== Death and legacy ==
Pennington died at a hospital in Oxford and after a service at her Lady Margaret Hall her ashes were buried in Oxford. In 1985 her articles on "Music in Moldovia" were gathered together and published. One of her students completed her unfinished project to list the Cyrillic documents in the British Isles. It was titled the Anne Pennington Catalogue.

== Works include ==
- Complete Poems., ed. Francis R. Jones, co-tr. Anne Pennington, introduction Ted Hughes. Anvil, 2011.
- Vasko Popa: Collected Poems 1943-1976, trans. Anne Pennington (Persea Books of New York, 1978)
