= Association of Belarusians in Great Britain =

- Згуртаваньне беларусаў у Вялікай Брытаніі
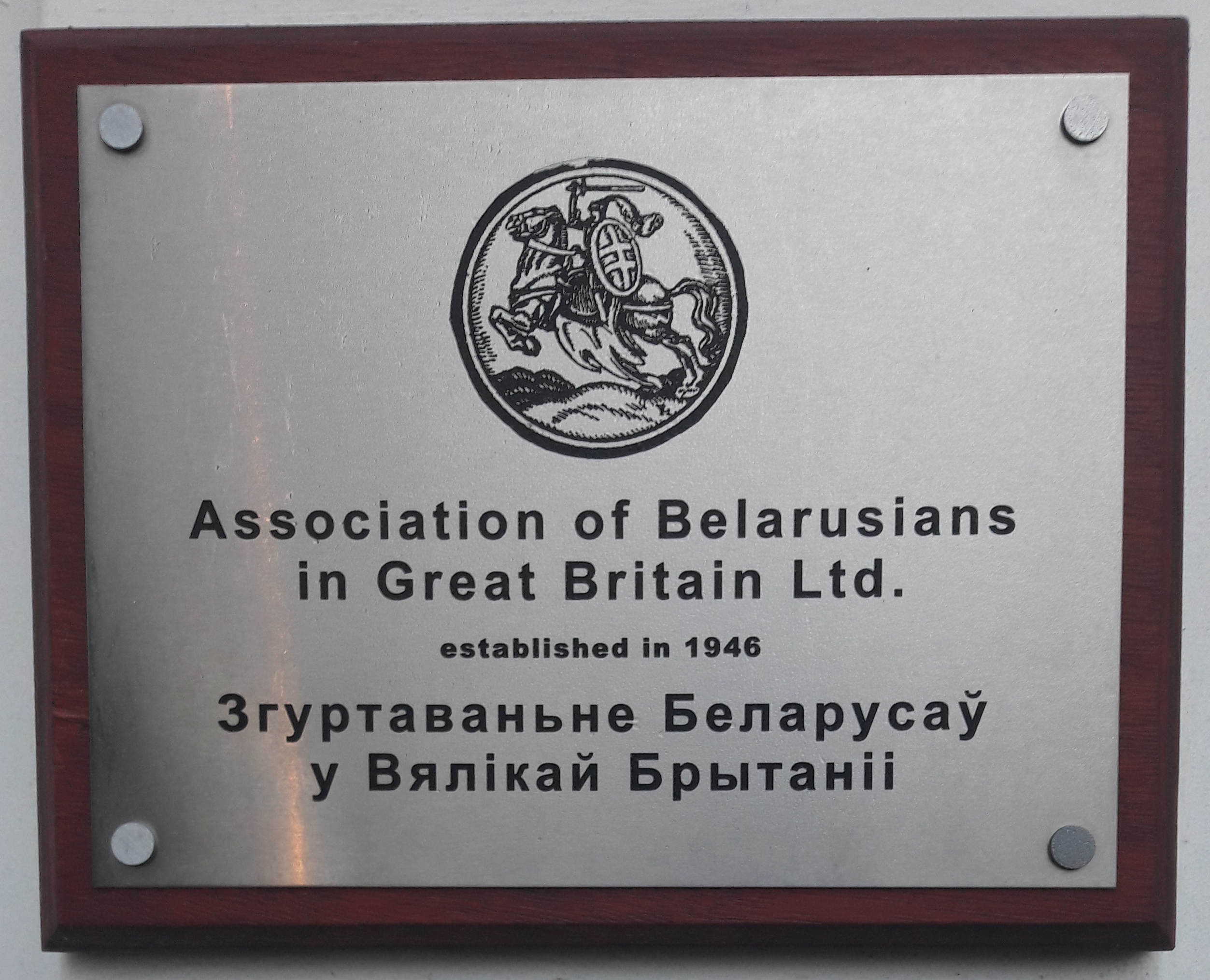
- Formation: 1946
- Location: London, United Kingdom
- Head: Mikalaj Packajeu
- Website: www.zbvb.org.uk

The Association of Belarusians in Great Britain (Belarusian: Згуртаваньне беларусаў у Вялікай Брытаніі, Zhurtavańnie bielarusaŭ u Vialikaj Brytanii) is the oldest Belarusian organisation in the United Kingdom uniting members of the Belarusian diaspora since the late 1940s until the present day.

== History ==
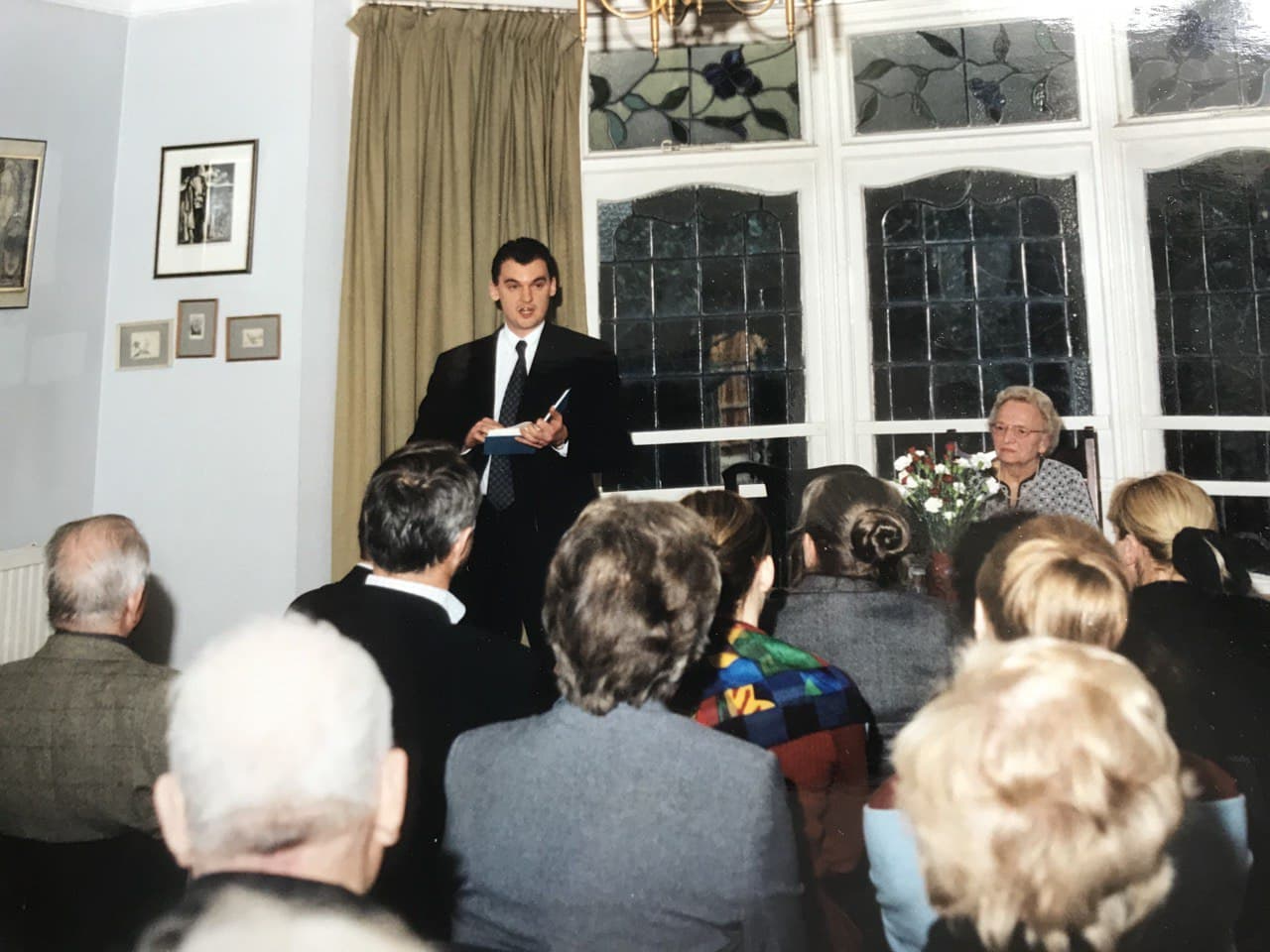
Commemorative meeting of the Association, sitting then chairwoman of the organisation Helen Michaluk, London, 2001’

After the end of World War II, several thousand ethnic Belarusians landed in Britain. Most of these people were former soldiers of the Polish Anders Army. Some of them were stationed in Britain during the war (1st Polish corps), with the bulk arriving from Italy with the 2nd Polish corps. The ranks were further swelled by arrival of so-called ‘displaced persons’ who found themselves outside Belarus during the war.

In 1946 the Association of Belarusians in Great Britain was established, with Dr. Vincent Žuk-Hryškievič as its chair. .

The organisation had branches in London, Manchester and Bradford and acquired several buildings for its activities, including the Belarusian House in Islington, London. It became the first organization of the Belarusian diaspora established by the wave of emigrants from Belarus after World War II.

With the support of the association, the Anglo-Belarusian Society was established in 1954 with the aim to promote Belarusian-British contacts.

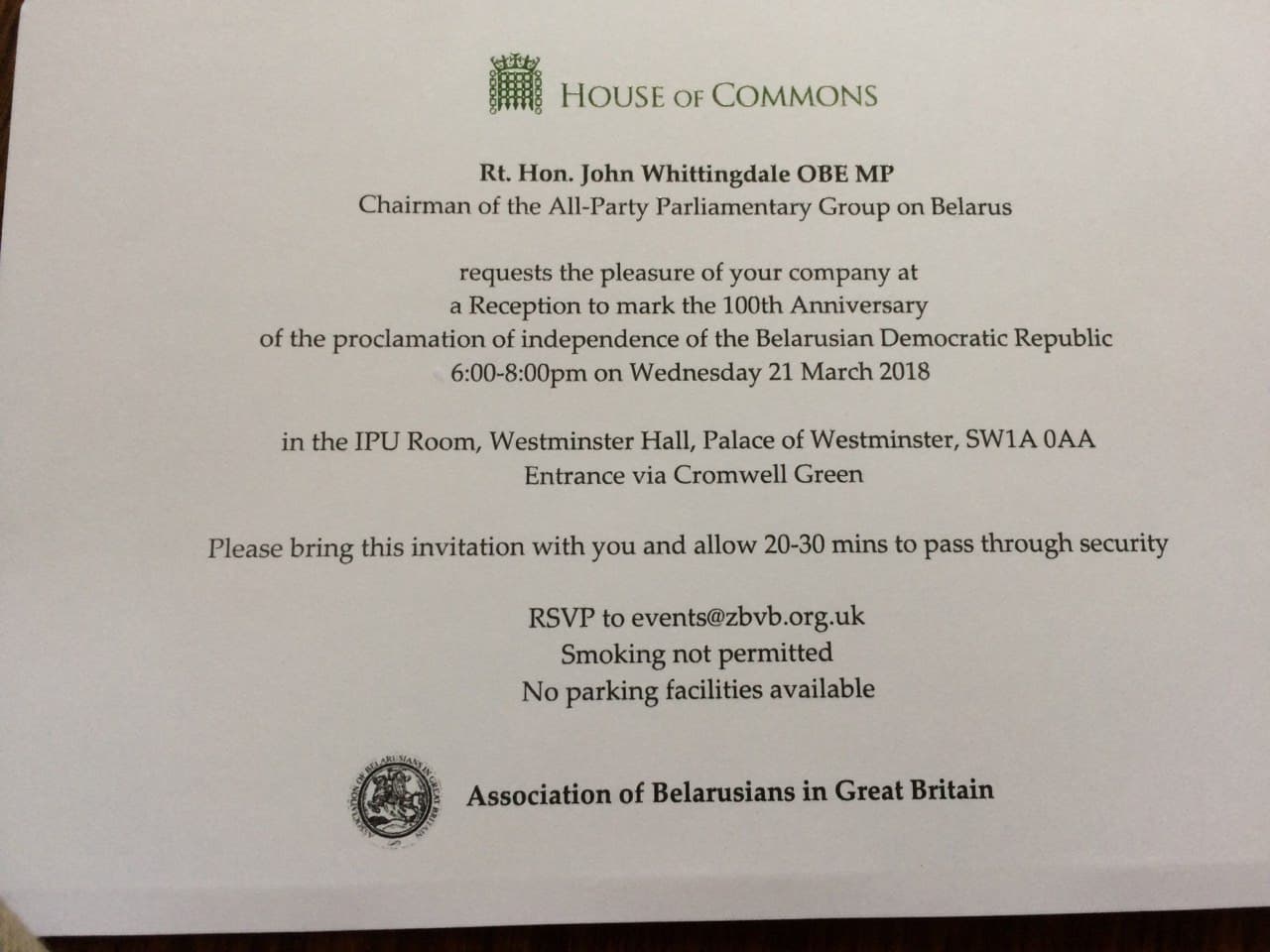
Invitation card for a reception on the occasion of commemoration of the centenary of the Belarusian Democratic Republic at the Palace of Westminster, London, 2018

== Present day ==
The Association’s present-day activities include among others:

- commemoration of notable events in the history of the Belarusian independence movement, such as the proclamation of the Belarusian Democratic Republic in 1918 and the Slutsk Uprising in 1921;
- collaboration with and support of the Belarusian Democracy Movement, the 2020-2021 Belarusian protests;
- financial support of Belarusian cultural projects;
- organisation of meetings in Britain with prominent Belarusian cultural and political figures;
- engagement with British politicians and journalists.

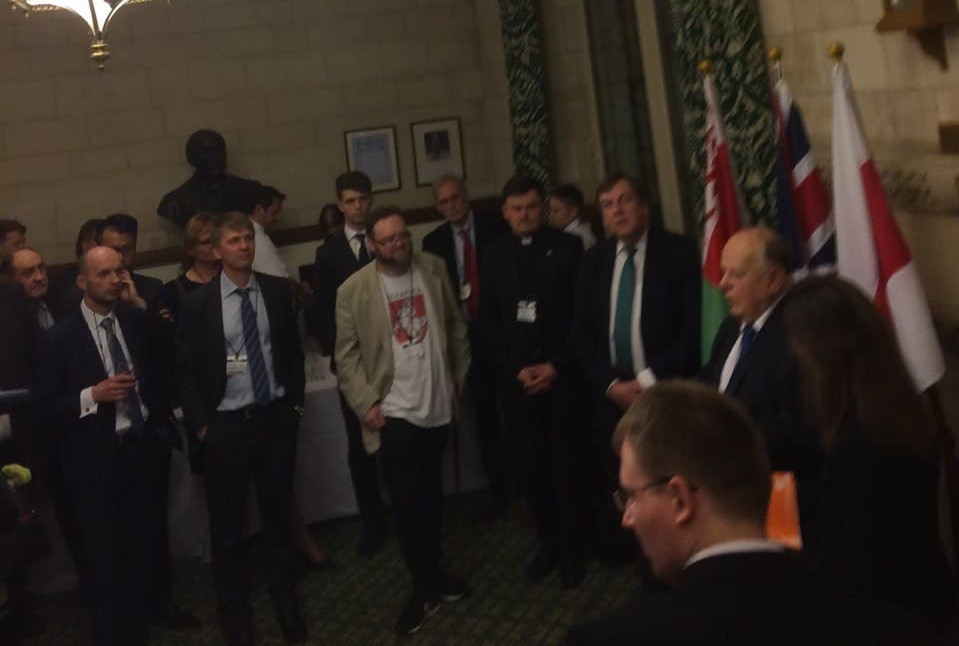
Speaking Stanislaŭ Šuškievič, the first head of independent Belarus, at a reception on the occasion of commemoration of the centenary of the Belarusian Democratic Republic, London, 2018

In 2018 the Association organised celebrations of the centenary of the proclamation of the Belarusian Democratic Republic at the Palace of Westminster.

Mikalaj Packajeu is the current head of the Association.

== Notable members ==
- Dr. Vincent Žuk-Hryškievič
- Ceslaus Sipovich
- Alexander Nadson
- Paval Navara
- Helen Michaluk
- Andrej Aliaksandraŭ
