= International Sakharov Environmental Institute =

Institute in Minsk, Belarus

- Международный государственный экологический институт им. А.Д. Сахарова; Міжнародны дзяржаўны экалагічны інстытут імя А.Д. Сахарава
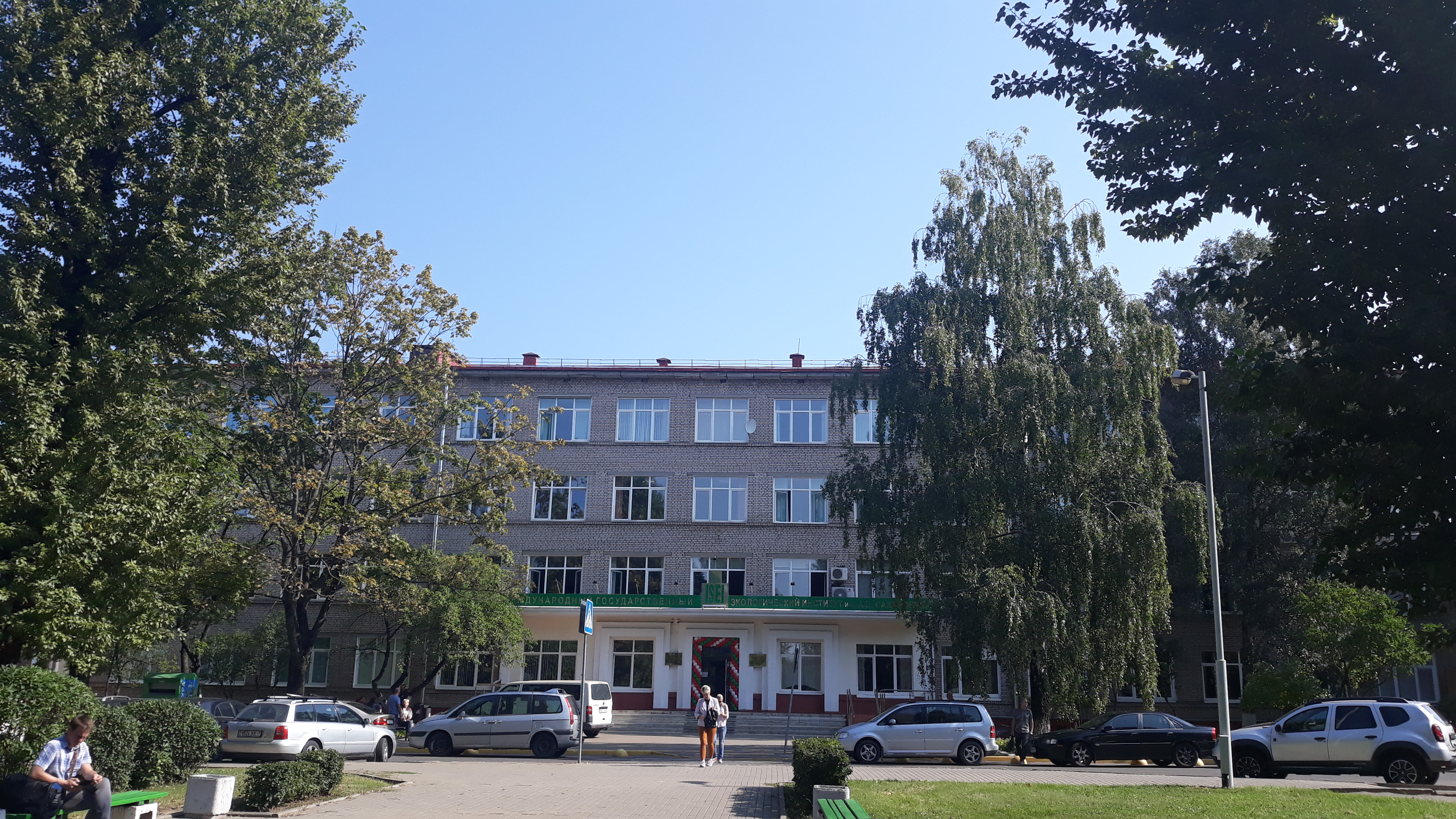
- International Sakharov Environmental Institute main building
- Former names: International Sakharov Higher College on Radioecology, International Sakharov Institute on Radioecology, International Sakharov Environmental University (ISEU)
- Type: State
- Established: 1992
- Director: Sergey Maskevich
- Prorector: Vladimir I. Krasovsky
- Students: 1,273
- Location: Minsk, Belarus; 53.89°N 27.61°E
- Website: www.iseu.by

International Sakharov Environmental Institute is an institute in Minsk, Belarus, part of the Belarusian State University.

The institute offers both undergraduate and graduate degrees.

In February 2011 1,273 full-time students were enrolled.

== History ==
International Sakharov Environmental Institute was formed on January 20, 1992 after the resolution of the Republic of Belarus in compliance with the recommendations of the International Sakharov Congress (Moscow, May, 1991) by means of the United Nations Organization.

The necessity of founding such an educational institution appeared as a result of the Chernobyl disaster of 1986, when there were practically no specialists professionally trained for minimization of the consequences of radiation accidents. Following the initiatives of the International Congress of memory of Andrei Sakharov “Peace, progress, human rights” and the program “Chernobyl” controlled by the United Nations Organization, Sakharov college was inaugurated in Minsk. The next stage of the development was 1994, when after the resolution of the Ministry of Education and Science of the Republic of Belarus the college became independent International Institute of Radioecology. In 1999 after the state accreditation the Institute acquired the status of University.

In May 2015 prorector Sergey S. Poznyak was appointed acting rector of the university. He is Doktor nauk in agricultural sciences.

Since 1 September 2015 the Institute is a division of Belarusian State University.

== Academics ==
The university consists of five faculties, as delineated below.

=== Faculty of environmental monitoring ===
The Faculty of Environmental Monitoring contains six academic departments: 1) the department of nuclear and radiation safety, 2) the department of environmental management and monitoring, 3) the department of energy efficient technologies; 4) the department of environmental information systems; 5) the department of physics and higher mathematics and 6) the department of philosophy, sociology and economics.

=== Faculty of ecological medicine ===
The faculty of ecological medicine prepares students to explore and assess the impact of biogenic and abiogenic environmental factors, on cells, tissues, organs and all body systems (cardiovascular, nervous, endocrine, immune, etc.) from molecular to populational level.

Lecturers, Except of post-graduates, magistrates and students work, undergo their probation periods and study in the leading scientific centers not only in Belarus, Russia and other member countries of CIS but Great Britain, France, Germany, Austria, Poland, Switzerland, Italy, Ireland, Canada USA, Israel and others.

== Honorary Doctors ==
- Alan Flowers, Honorary Doctor in Radioecology (2002)
