= International Committee of Slavists =

Scholarly organization

The International Committee of Slavists is a scholarly organization uniting the national committees of the Slavists of Australia, Austria, Belarus, Belgium, Bosnia and Herzegovina, Bulgaria, Canada, Croatia, the Czech Republic, Denmark, Estonia, Finland, France, Germany, Greece, Hungary, India, Israel, Italy, Japan, Lithuania, Macedonia, Moldova, the Netherlands, New Zealand, Norway, Poland, Romania, Russia, Serbia, Slovakia, Slovenia, Spain, Sweden, Switzerland, Ukraine, the United Kingdom, and the United States. The International Committee of Slavists is part of the UNESCO educational system.

The International Committee of Slavists was established in Yugoslavia (Belgrade, 1955), with the aim of renewing and continuing international relations in Slavic studies and traditions of the 1st International Congress of Slavists, which was held in Prague in 1929. It took over the organisation of that conference.

== See also ==
- Cyrillo-Methodian Studies
