= Boris Unbegaun =

Russian-German linguist (1898–1973)

Boris Ottokar Unbegaun (Russian: Бори́с Ге́нрихович Унбега́ун, romanized: Boris Genrikhovich Unbegaun) (1898, Moscow – 1973) was a Russian-born German linguist and philologist, expert in Slavic studies: Slavic languages and literature. He worked in universities of France, Great Britain and the United States.

He was a Professor of Slavonic studies at Oxford University and he was succeeded by his student Anne Pennington.

== Major works ==
- La langue russe au XVIe siècle (1500—1550). — Paris: Inst. d'Études Slaves de l'Univ. de Paris, 1935.
- Les débuts de la langue littéraire chez les Serbes. — Paris: Champion, 1935.
- Grammaire russe. — Lyon-Paris, IAC, 1951 (English translation: Russian grammar. Oxford: Clarendon Press, 1957; German translation: Russische Grammatik. — Göttingen: Vandenhoeck & Ruprecht, 1969)
- L'Origine du nom des Ruthènes. — Winnipeg: Acad. ukrainienne libre des sciences, 1953.
- A bibliographical guide to the Russian language. — Oxford: Clarendon Press, 1953.
- Russian versification. — Oxford: Clarendon Press, 1956.
- Drei russische Grammatiken des 18. Jahrhunderts. Nachdr. der Ausg. von 1706, 1731 und 1750. — München: Fink, 1969.
- Studies in Slavic Linguistics and Poetics. — New York: New York University Press., 1969.
- Selected papers on Russian and Slavonic philology. — Oxford: Clarendon Press 1969.
- Russian surnames. — Oxford: Clarendon Press, 1972. Russian translation: Унбегаун Б.-О. Русские фамилии. — Moscow: Progress Publisher, 1989
