= Jazep Hermanovich =

Belarusian Greek Catholic priest and poet

Jazep Hiermanovich MIC
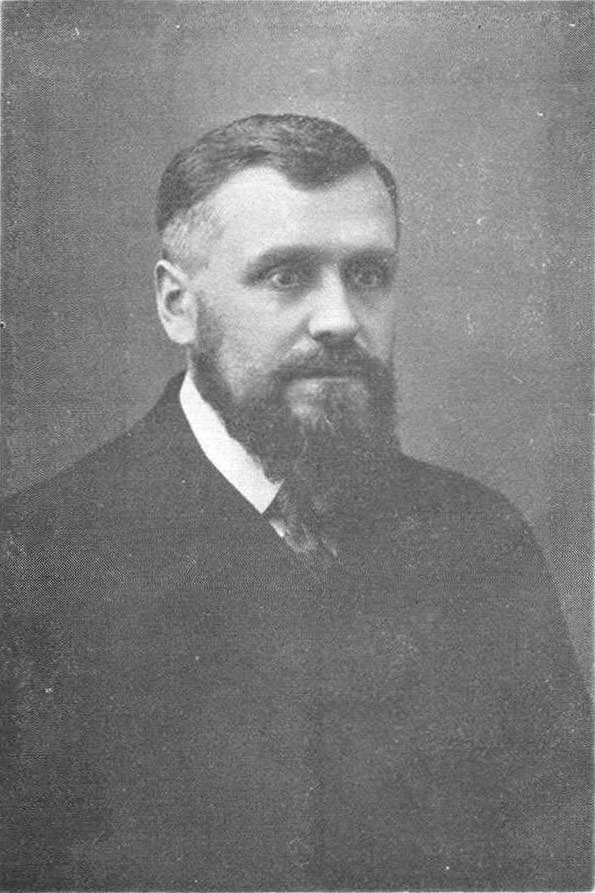
- Hiermanovich in 1932
- Native name: Язэп Германовіч
- Church: Belarusian Greek Catholic Church

Personal details
- Born: 4 March 1890 Halshany, Russian Empire (now Belarus)
- Died: 26 December 1978 (aged 88) London, United Kingdom
- Writing career
- Pen name: Vincuk Advažny
- Genre: Poetry

Jazep Hiermanovich (also Yazep Germanovich, Belarusian Latin alphabet: Jazep Hermanovič; Belarusian: Язэп Германовіч; Polish: Józef Hermanowicz, 4 March 1890 - 26 December 1978) was a Belarusian Greek Catholic priest, poet and Gulag survivor.

== Early life ==
Hermanovich was born in Halshany into a Belarusian Roman Catholic peasant family. He studied at schools in Halshany and Ashmiany.

In 1913, he graduated from a Catholic seminary in Vilnius and was ordained priest.

== Work in West Belarus ==
In 1921, he became a member of the Society of the Belarusian School, an organization promoting Belarusian-language education in West Belarus which was then part of the Second Polish Republic and where ethnic Belarusians and other speakers of minority languages faced coercive polonization by the Polish state. For some time, he preached Belarusian language sermons at the Church of St. Nicholas in Vilnius (then Wilno).

In 1924, Hermanovich joined the Congregation of Marian Fathers. He moved to the town of Druja where he was part of the community of Belarusian Marian Priests which was influential among Belarusian Catholics in interwar Poland.

While in Druja, Hermanovich started publishing his literary works under the pseudonym Vincuk Advažny (Vincuk the Brave).

== Missionary work in Harbin, Gulag captivity ==
In 1932, Hermanovich was sent to Harbin, China, to do missionary work to spread the Russian Greek Catholic Church among the community of Harbin Russians with the Russian Catholic Apostolic Exarchate of Harbin. He was head of the Catholic Lyceum of St Nicolas in Harbin, taking care of Russian orphans who lost their parents in the Russian Civil War.

In 1936, Hermanovich returned to Poland because of health reasons. In 1938, he and other Belarusian Marian fathers were deported from Druja to central Poland as part of a wave of repressions by the Polish Government against Belarusian nationalists and language revival activists. After this, Hermanovich returned to Harbin.

In 1948, Hermanovich was arrested by the communist Chinese authorities and handed over to the Soviet NKVD. After several months of interrogations and tortures, Hermanovich and other teachers of the Marian lyceum of Harbin were sentenced to 25 years of incarceration and labour in the Gulag concentration camps. Hermanovich was deported to concentration camps near Tayshet and then near Bratsk. While in the Gulag, Hermanovich held secret religious services among other inmates.

== Emigration to the United Kingdom ==
After Stalin's death in 1953, Hermanovich was released and as a former Polish citizen deported to communist Poland in 1955. From there he was able to move to the Vatican and then to London where he joined the community of Belarusian Catholic priests (Ceslaus Sipovic, Leo Haroshka, Alexander Nadson and others) who had settled there after the Second World War.

Since 1960, Father Hermanovich resided at the Marian House in North Finchley, London, until his death on 26 December 1978. He is buried at St. Pancras and Islington Cemetery along with his Marian confreres. While living in London, Hermanovich was teaching at St Cyril of Turau Belarusian school and was also an editor-in-chief of the Belarusian emigre Catholic journal Božym šlacham, sent to subscribers all over the world. In London he published a number of literary works as well as translated the Book of Psalms.

== See also ==
- Church of St Cyril of Turau and All the Patron Saints of the Belarusian People
- Alexander Nadson
- Ceslaus Sipovic

== Literary works ==
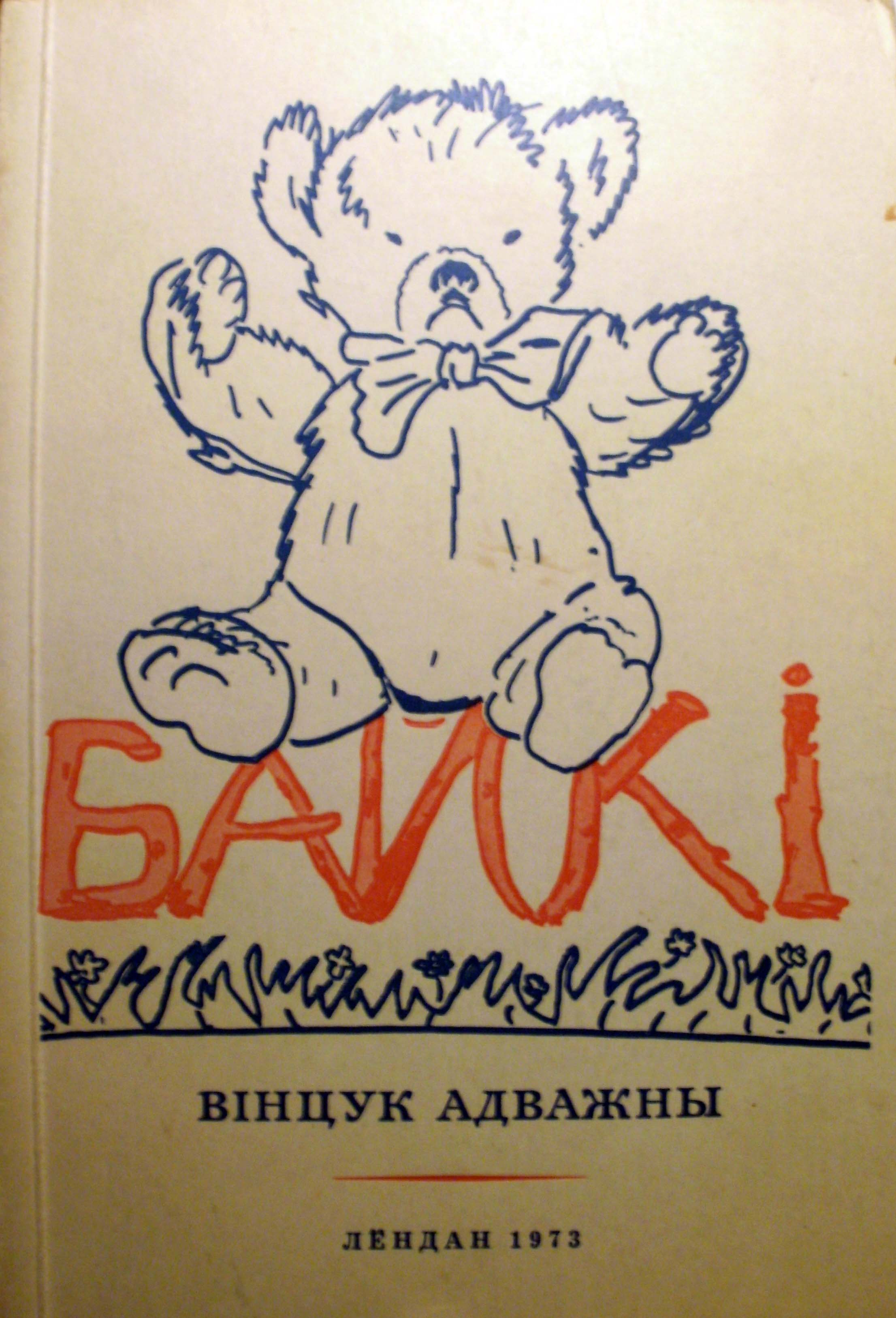
Cover of a storybook by Jazep Hermanovich (Vincuk Advažny) published in London in 1973

- Як Казюк сабраўся да споведзі (How Kaziuk prepared for the confession), Vilnius, 1928; Minsk, 2011
- Казюковае жанімства (Kaziuk’s wedding), Vilnius, 1929
- Як Гануля зьбіралася ў Аргентыну (How Hanula prepared to go to Argentina), Vilnius, 1930.
- Адам і Анелька (Adam and Anelka), Vilnius, 1931
- Канёк-Гарбунок (The Little Humpbacked Horse, adaptation of the tale by Pyotr Pavlovich Yershov), Vilnius, 1932.
- Бэтлейка (The batleyka), Vilnius, 1932.
- Унія на Палесьсі (The Church Union in Polesia), Albercin, 1932; Brest, 2004
- Беларускія цымбалы (The Belarusian cymbalo), Vilnius, 1933
- Казка аб рыбаку і рыбцы (The tale of the fisher and the fish), Vilnius, 1935.
- Хлапец (The boy), Vilnius, 1935.
- Гануліны клопаты (Hanula’s worries), Vilnius, 1935.
- Кітай-Сібір-Масква (China - Siberia - Moscow (memories)), Munich, 1962; Minsk-St. Petersburg, 2003 ISBN 5-94716-033-1
- Пакутныя псальмы (Penitential Psalms, versed translation), Rome, 1964.
- Przeżyłem sowieckie łagry. Wspomnienia (I survived the Soviet concentration camps. Memoirs), 1966
- Князь і лапаць. Сучасная казка (The king and the bast shoe), London, 1964.
- Байкі і іншыя вершы (Fables and other verses), London, 1973.
- Выбраныя творы (Selected Works), Minsk, 2011
