= Church of St Cyril of Turau and All the Patron Saints of the Belarusian People =

Greek Catholic Church in London, England

Coordinates: 51.6167°N 0.1847°W

Belarusian Memorial Chapel
- Church of Saint Cyril of Turaŭ and All the Patron Saints of the Belarusian People
- Царква Сьвятога Кірылы Тураўскага і ўсіх сьвятых заступнікаў беларускага народу
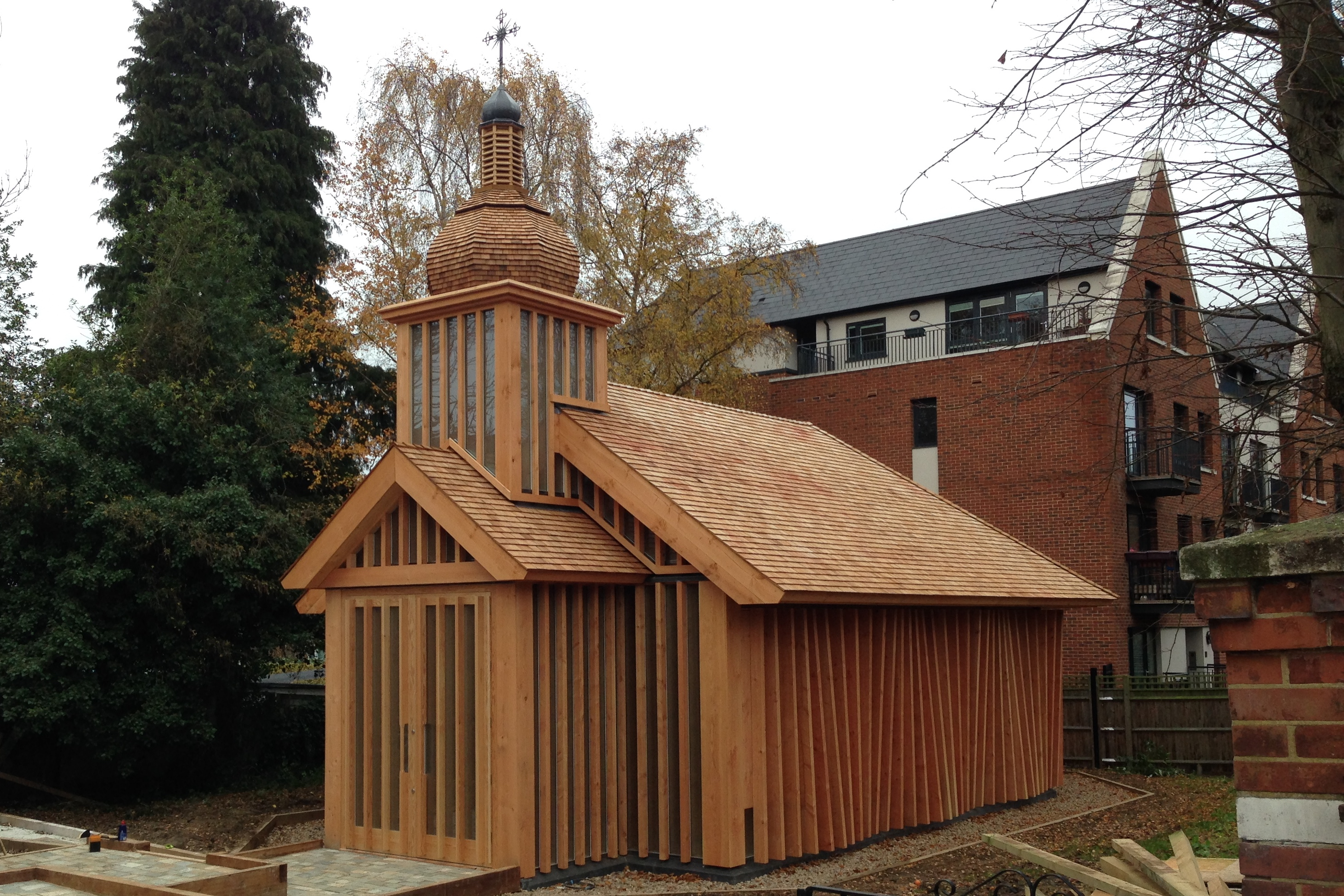
- The Belarusian Church in 2016

- Location of the Belarusian Church in London
- Location: Barnet, London
- Country: England
- Denomination: Belarusian Greek Catholic Church
- Website: belaruschurch.org.uk

History
- Dedication: Staint Cyril of Turaŭ
- Consecrated: 17 December 2016

Architecture
- Architect: Tszwai So
- Completed: 2017

Clergy
- Priest: Fr. Siarhiej Stasievich

Church of St Cyril of Turau and All the Patron Saints of the Belarusian People (Belarusian: Царква Сьвятога Кірылы Тураўскага і ўсіх сьвятых заступнікаў беларускага народу, romanized: Carkva Śviatoha Kiryły Turaŭskaha i ŭsich śviatych zastupnikaŭ biełaruskaha narodu, also known as the Belarusian Memorial Chapel) is a wooden church in Woodside Park, London.

It is the first wooden church built in London since the Great Fire. It is also the first purpose-built Eastern Catholic Church in London, the first memorial dedicated to the 1986 Chernobyl Nuclear Disaster erected in Western Europe, the first Belarusian Uniate Church built outside Belarus and the first church building made principally out of cross laminated timber panels in London.

The church is located next to the Francis Skaryna Belarusian Library and Museum and the Marian House, a Belarusian community centre in Northern London.

== Construction ==
The Belarusian Catholic mission existed in London since 1947, led by exiled priests Ceslaus Sipovich, Leo Haroshka and later Alexander Nadson. The mission is historically closely related to the Francis Skaryna Belarusian Library and Museum, for which it became the initial base. During the first decades of its existence, the mission only had an in-house chapel for worship, not a separate church.

The construction of the church began in November 2015; the foundation was completed in January 2016 and the cornerstone brought from the Holy Trinity Church in Druja was laid during a ceremony presided by the Apostolic Papal Nuncio, Archbishop Antonio Mennini and the Bishop of the Ukrainian Catholic Eparchy of Holy Family of London, Bishop Hlib Lonchyna, on 7 February 2016. It was consecrated on 17 December 2016.

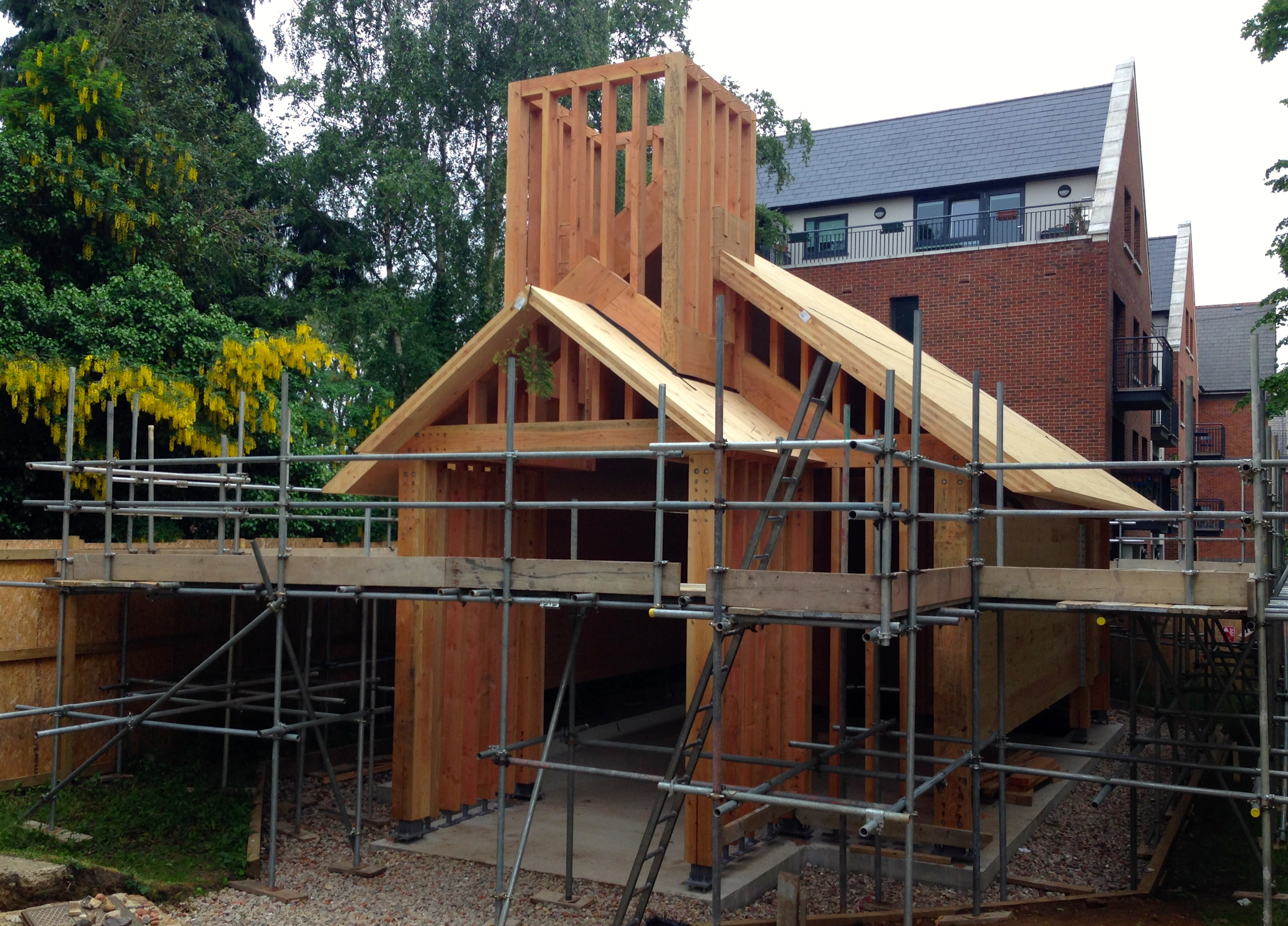
After installation of the walls and roof (June 2016)

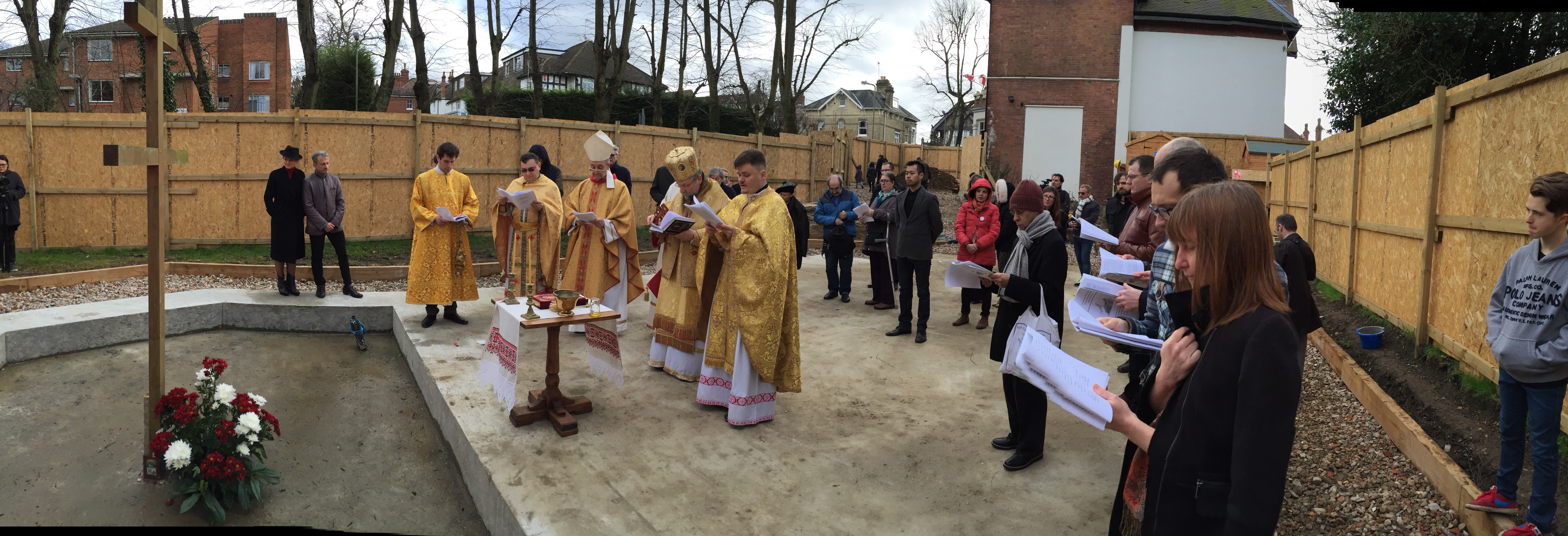
Blessing of the cornerstone of the newly erected church of St Cyril of Turau and All the Patron Saints of the Belarusian People. London, 7 February 2016

== Architecture ==
The design of the church was primarily inspired by the rural wooden churches in Belarus. The materials palette was restricted to wood and glass. The church has been clad in timber with restricted areas of clerestory windows and obscured glazing. It is therefore essentially ‘windowless’ reflecting the inward-focused Byzantine liturgical tradition. The design of the external walls was inspired by the traditional vertical timber cladding of the Baroque Uniate churches of Belarus.

=== Awards ===
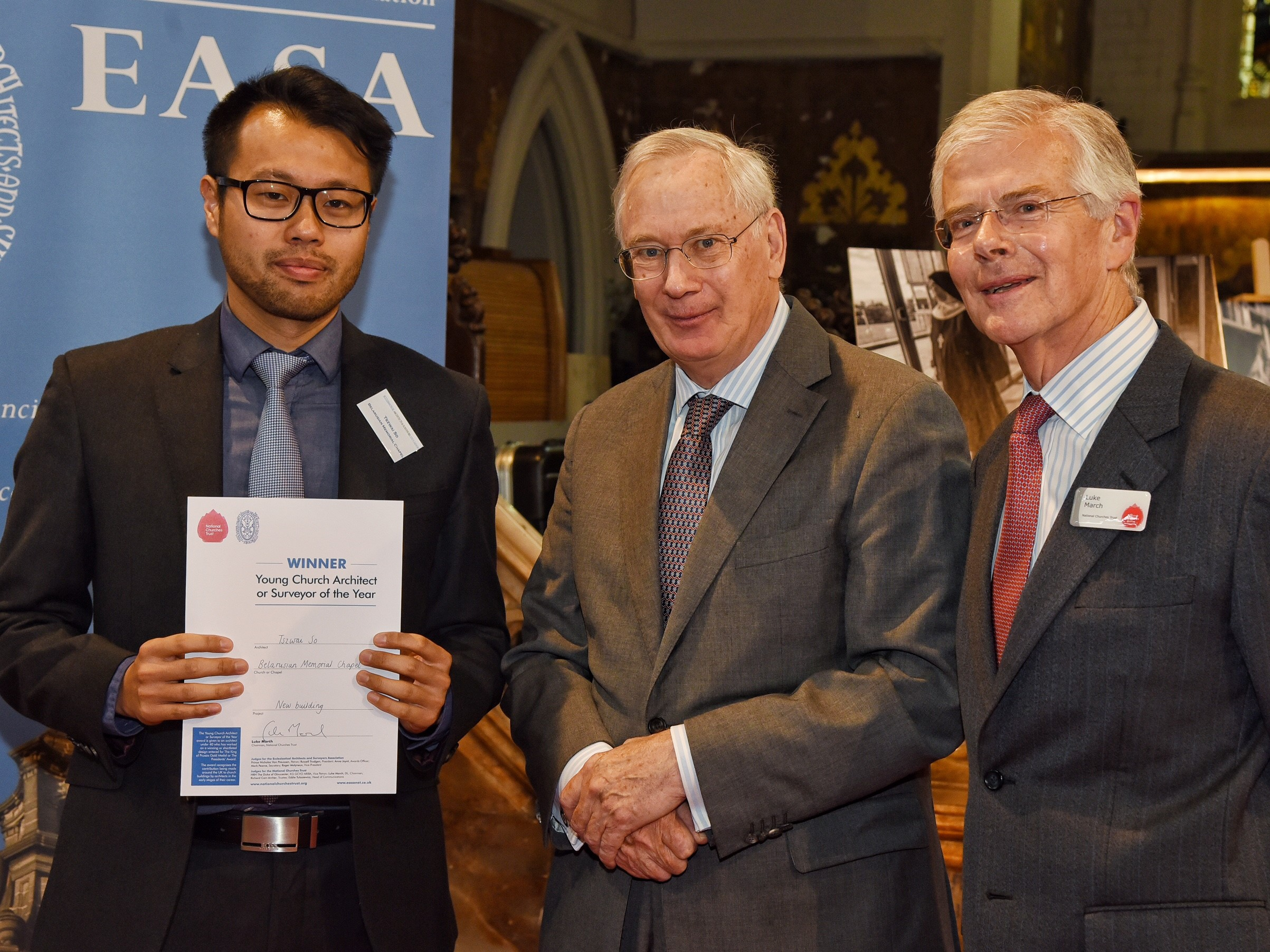
Tszwai So, architect of the Belarusian Memorial Chapel, winner of the Young Church Architect or Surveyor of the Year

The church was featured at the 2017 London Festival of Architecture and received the RIBA London Regional Award 2017 of the Royal Institute of British Architects. It has also been named People's Choice at the New London Awards 2017 by New London Architecture.

The church was chosen by the Royal Academy of Arts as one of the 10 buildings to see at Open House London 2017. Architizer has named it one of the 10 Catholic Churches Designed to Uplift and Inspire. On 21 October 2018, ArchDaily included the Belarusian chapel to the list of 32 best chapels previously published on the site.

The church was also nominated for the EU Prize in Contemporary Architecture – Mies Van der Rohe Award 2019, the highest accolade in European Architecture, and included in the list of top 100 21st-century buildings by the Twentieth Century Society in 2026.

== Interiors ==
The iconostasis and the altar area of the church contain icons painted in 1926 by the Russian Catholic convert Duchess Olga Bennigsen and Eric Ward (presumably a son of either William George Ward, theologian and mathematician, or of his son Wilfrid Philip Ward) for an Eastern Liturgical Week at the Westminster Cathedral as well as several icons from the former iconostasis of the Belarusian Catholic church of Christ the Redeemer in Chicago, now closed.

=== Burials ===
On 13 May 2017 the ashes of Vera Rich, an English poet and translator from the Belarusian language, were buried in the church.

== Gallery ==
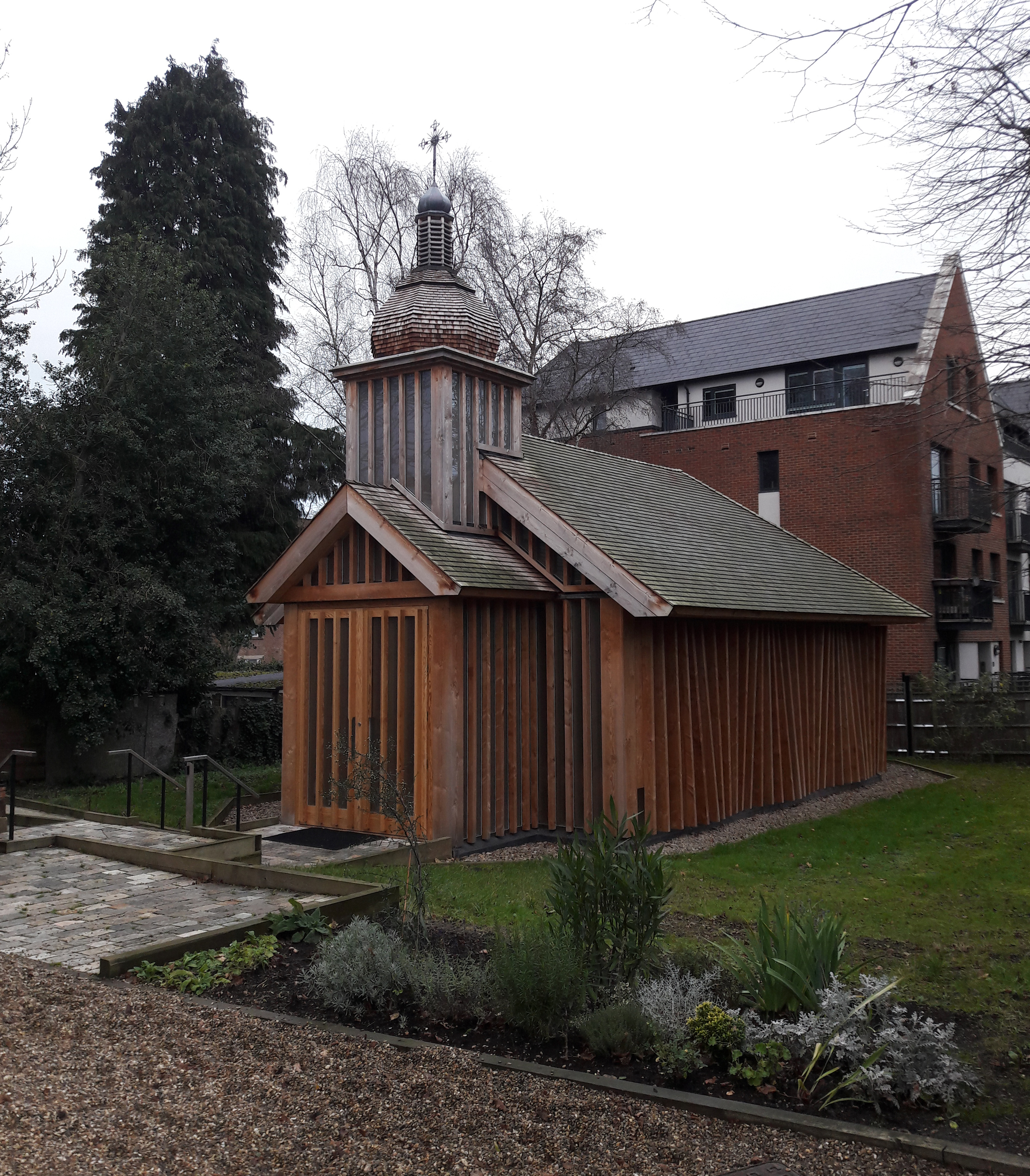
The Belarusian Church of London in 2018

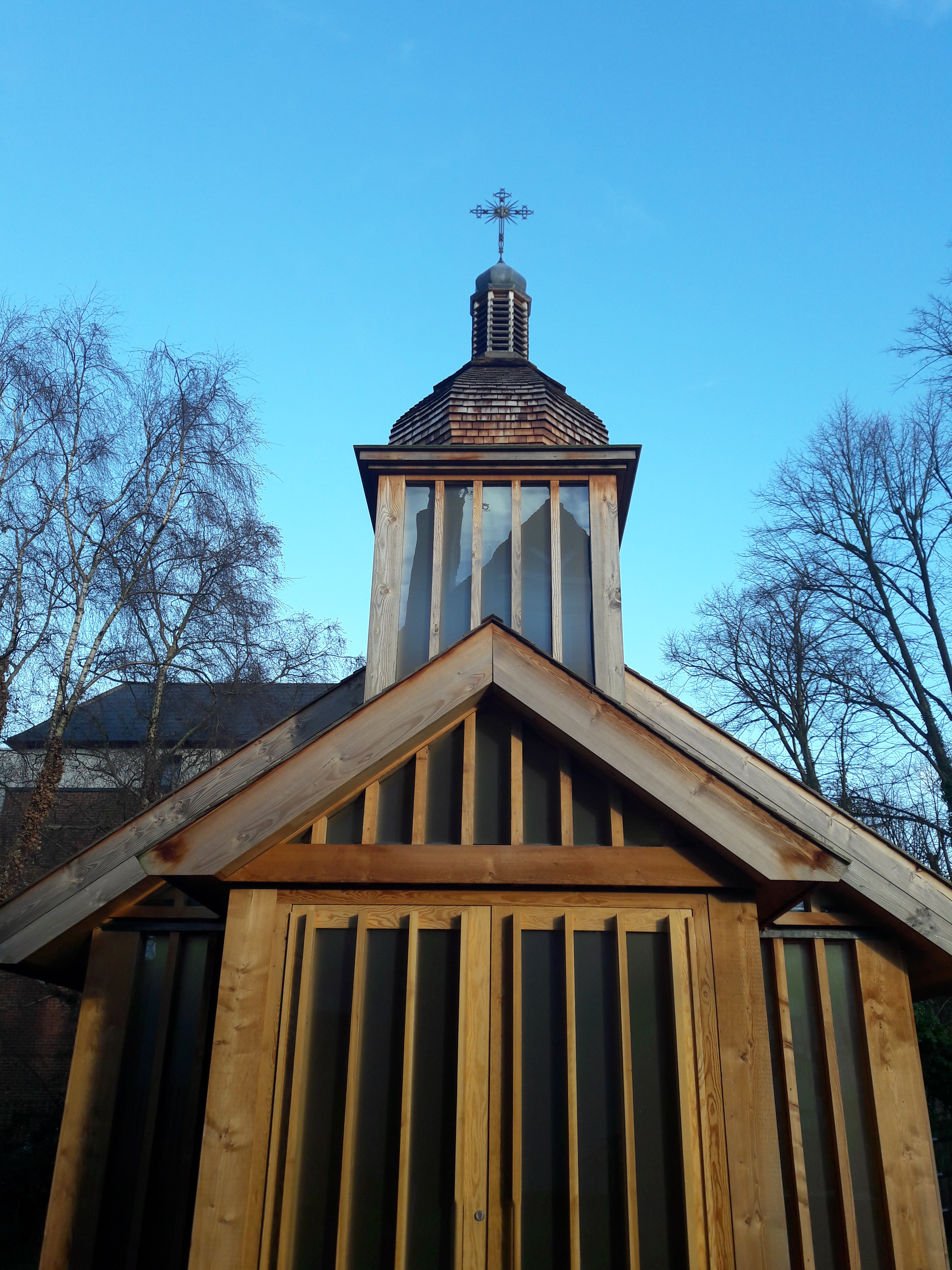
The church's bell tower

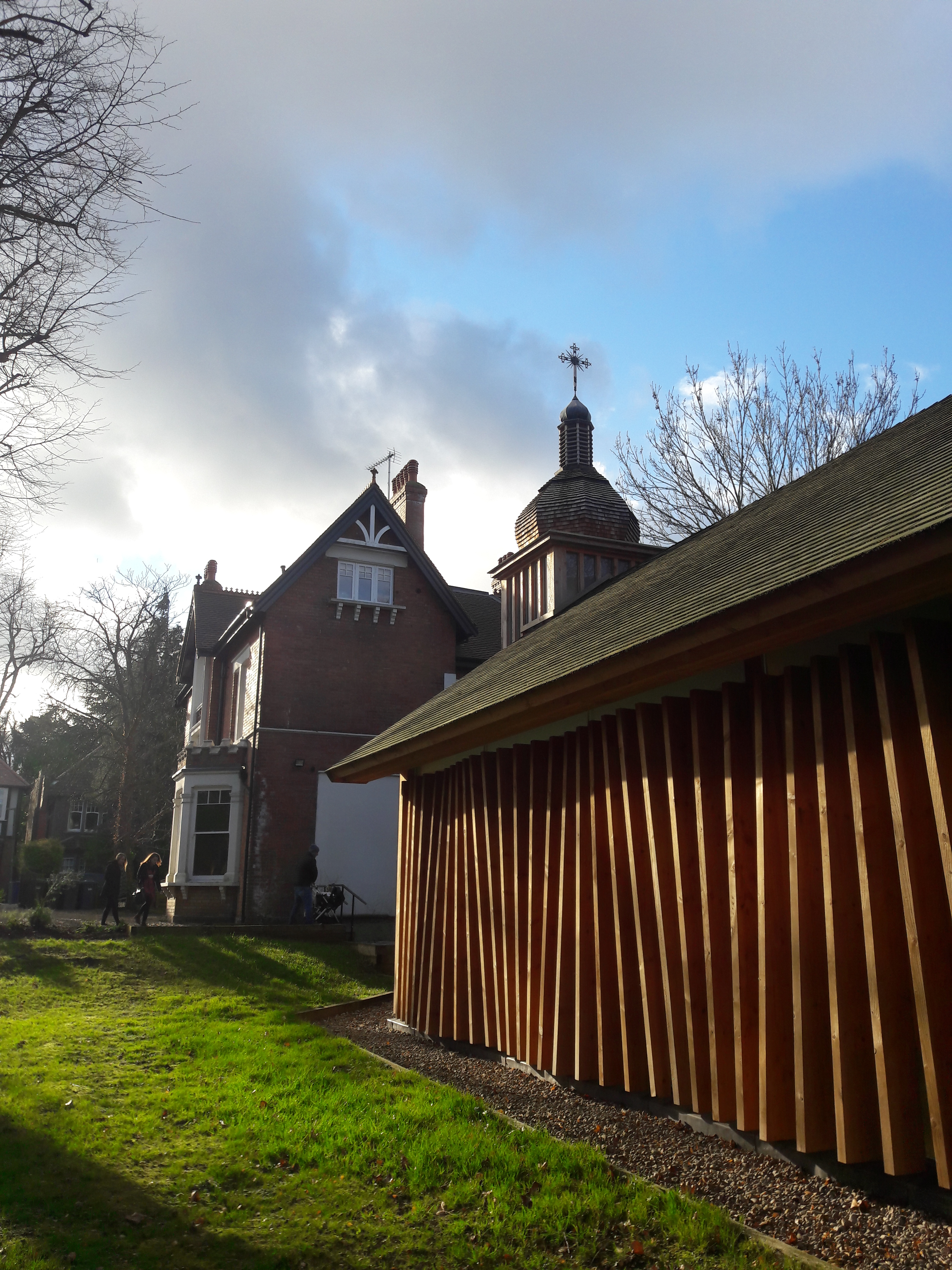
The church and Marian House, the Belarusian Catholic community centre

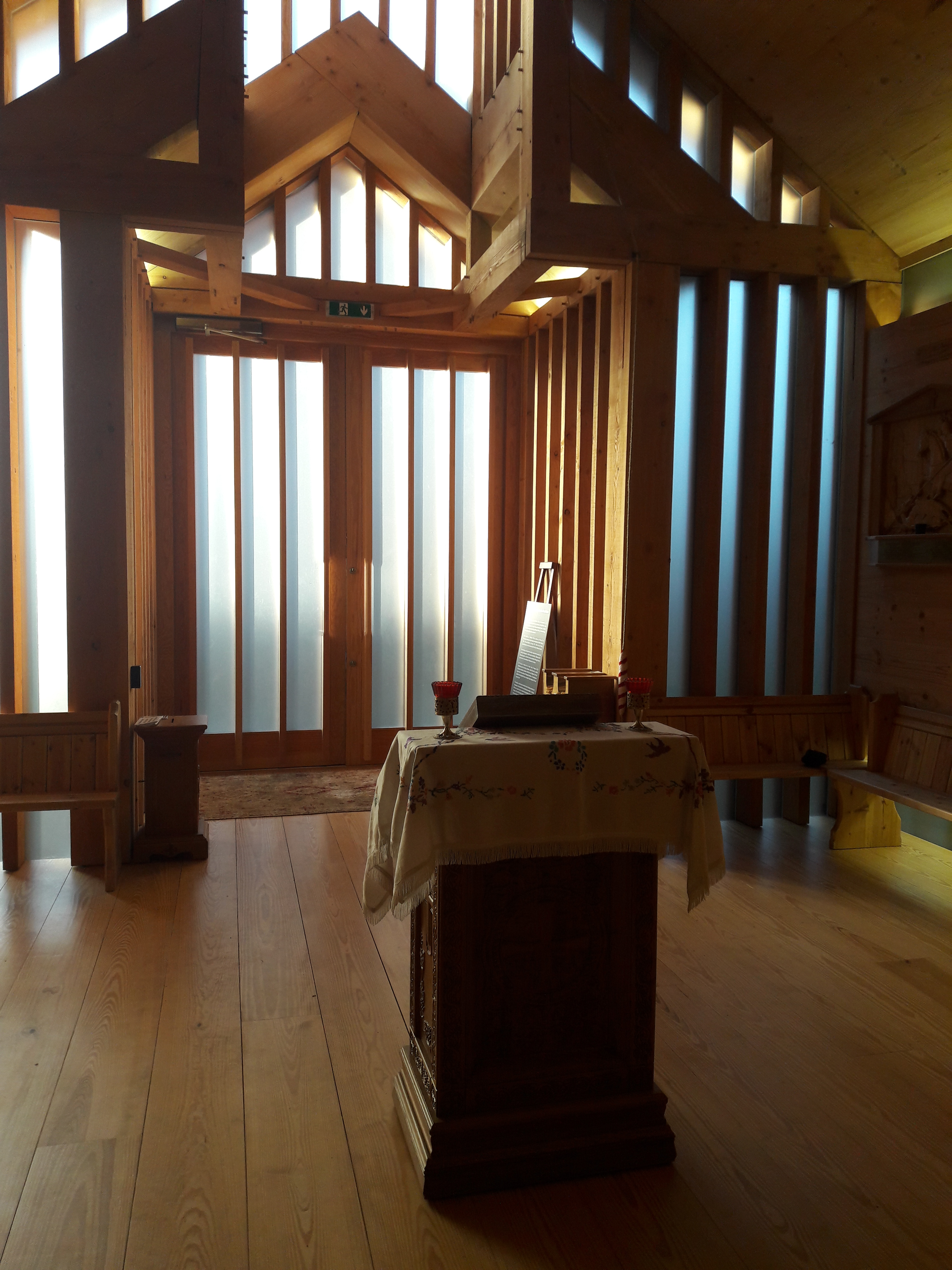
Interiors of the church

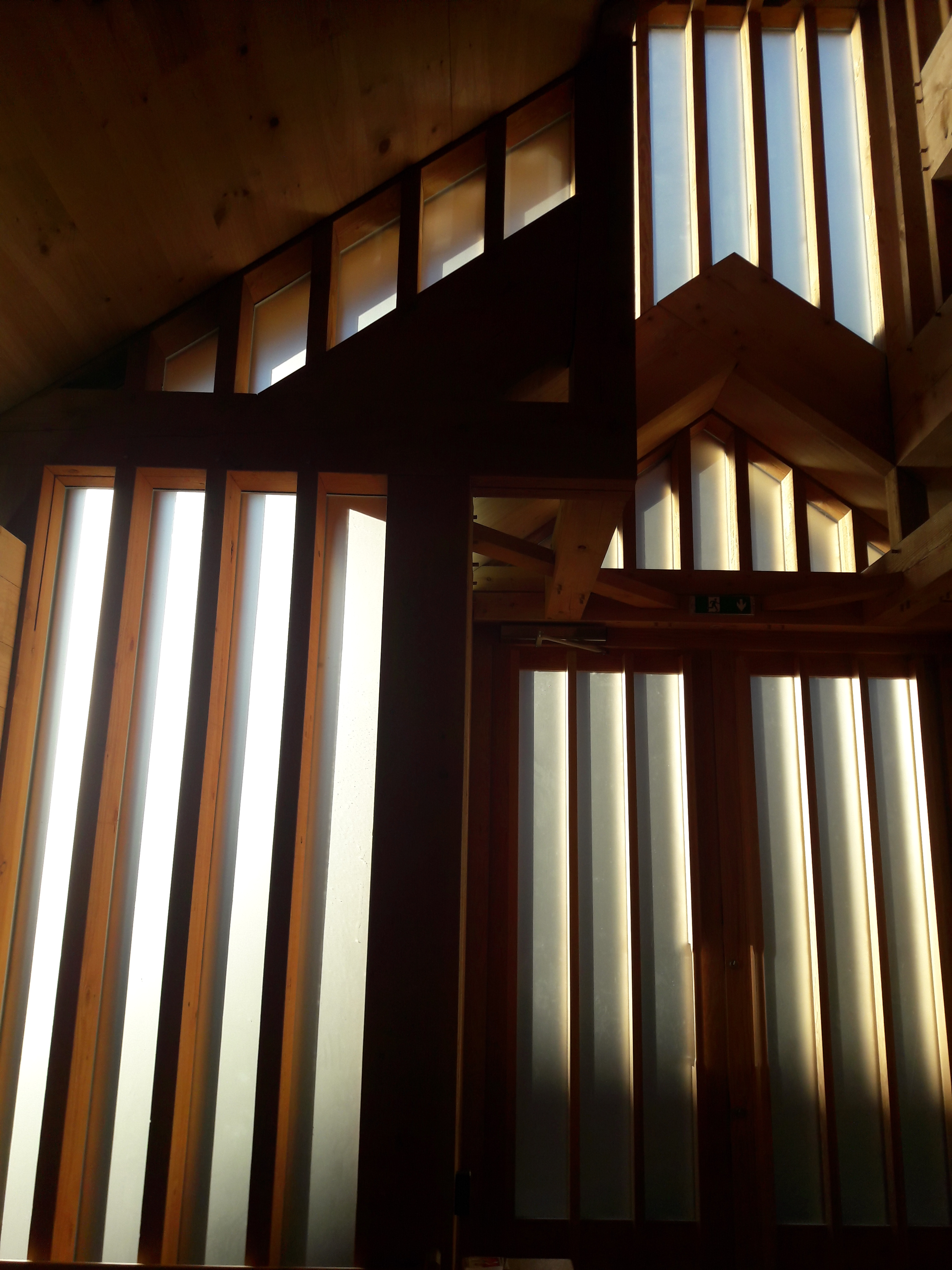
Interiors of the church

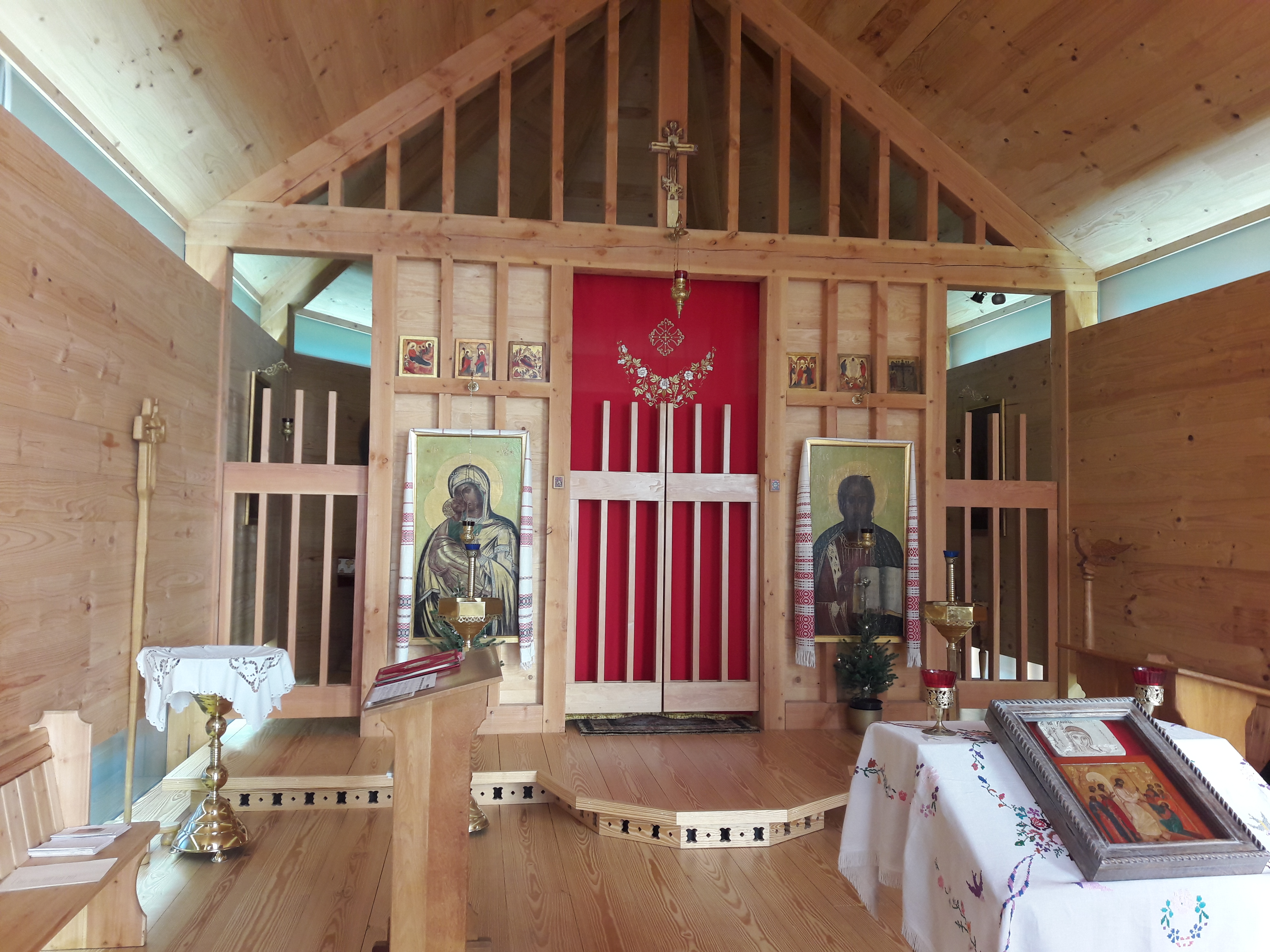
Interiors of the church, iconostasis

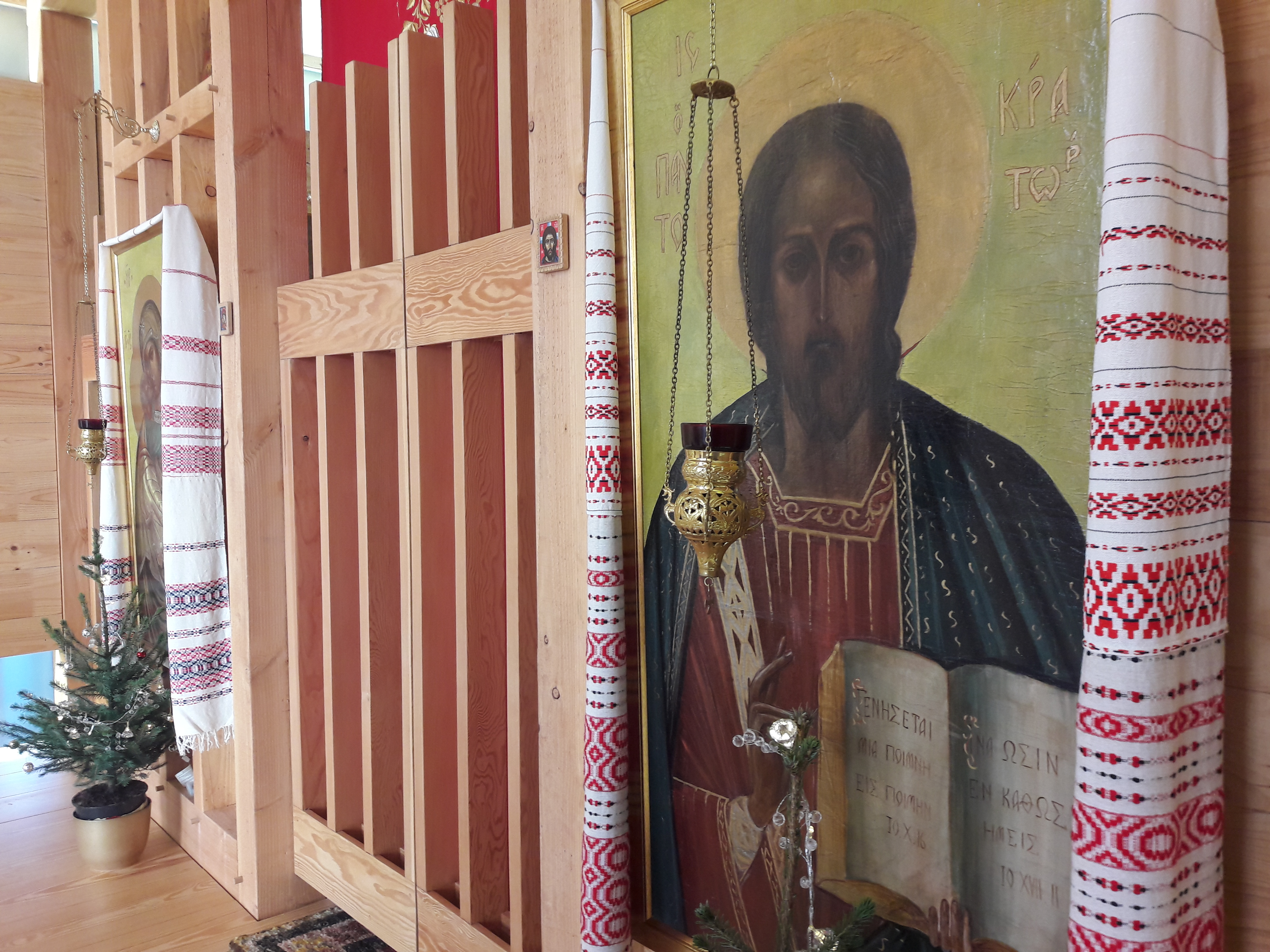
The iconostasis with icons painted in the mid-1920s

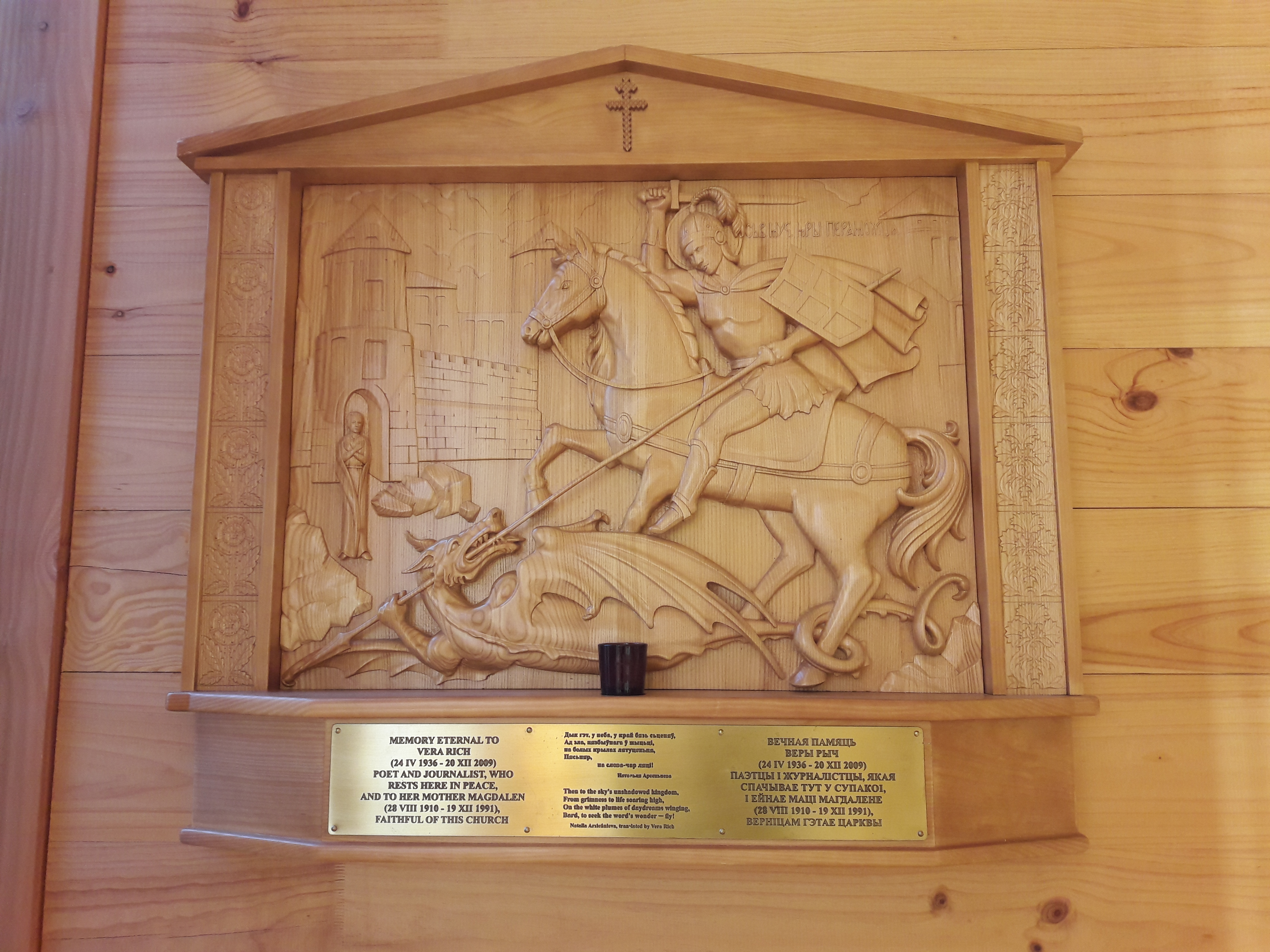
Burial of poet and translator Vera Rich

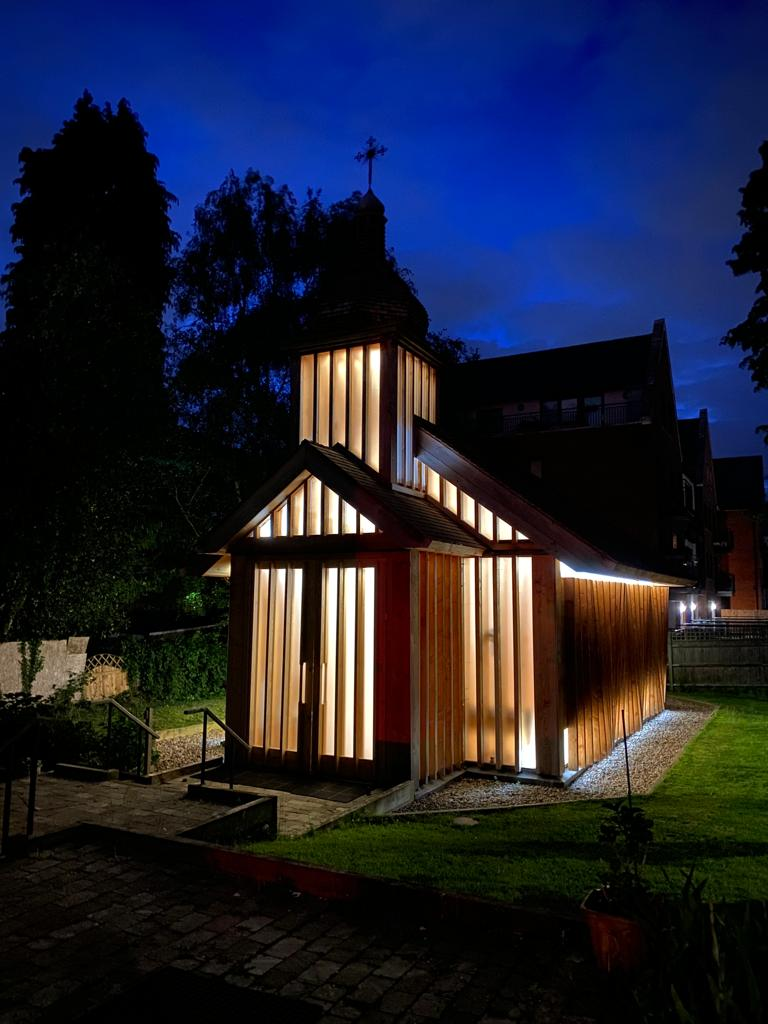
The church at night in 2022

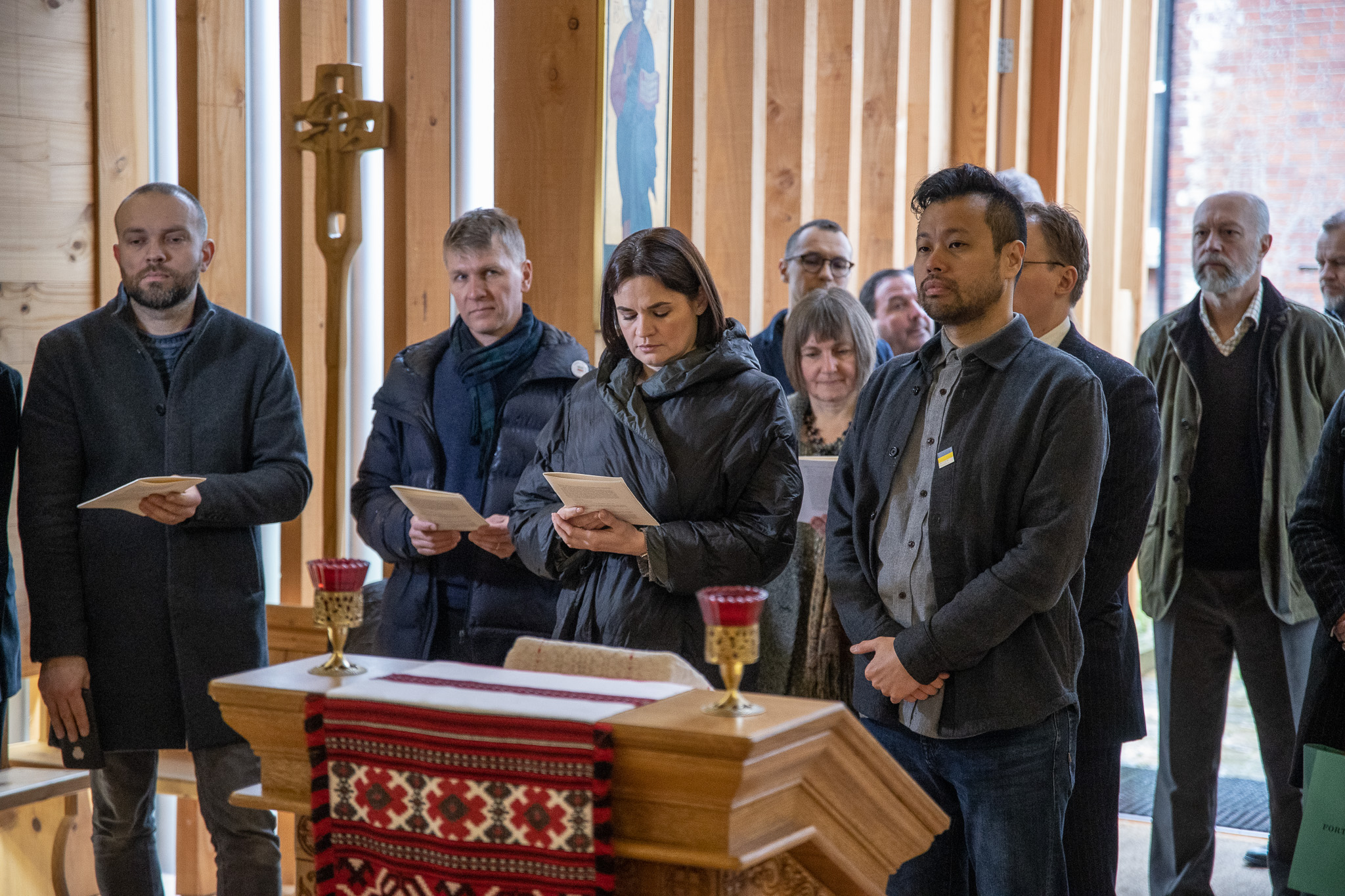
Sviatlana Tsikhanouskaya attending a service at the church in 2023

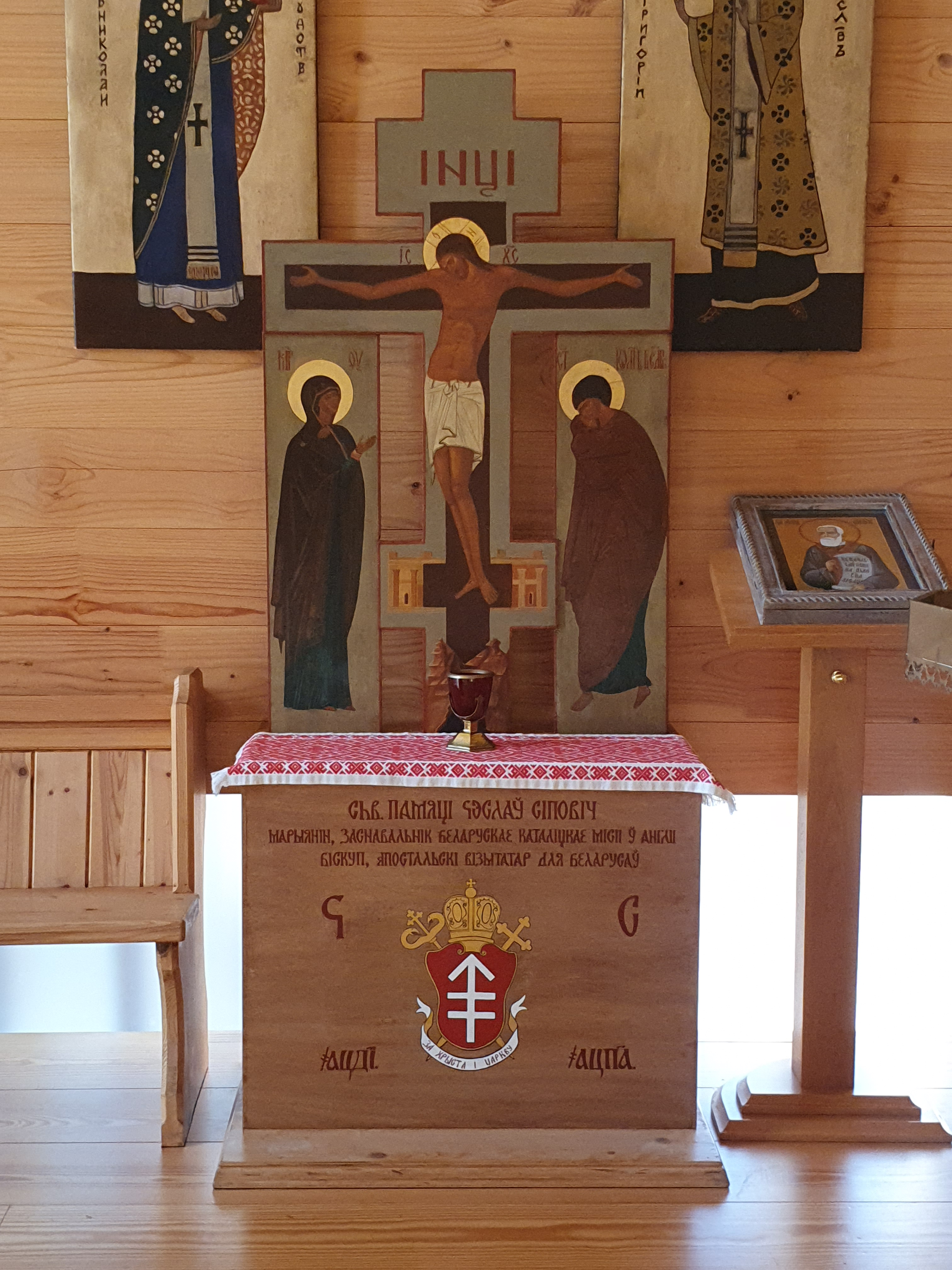
Memorial to bishop Ceslaus Sipovich

== See also ==
- Belarusians in the United Kingdom
- Belarusian Greek Catholic Church
