= Michaś Naŭmovič =

Belarusian-French artist and physiotherapist

- Міхась Наўмовіч
- Born: October 3, 1922; Kašaliova village, Navahrudak district (nowadays - Belarus)
- Died: March 8, 2004 (aged 81) near Paris, France
- Education: Beaux-Arts de Paris
- Occupations: artist and physiotherapist

Michaś Naŭmovič (Belarusian: Міхась Наўмовіч, 3 October 1922 – 8 March 2004) was a prominent figure of the Belarusian diaspora in France, artist and physiotherapist.

== Early years ==
Naŭmovič was born into a farming family in the village of Kašaliova in Navahrudak district, Second Polish Republic (nowadays – Belarus) on 3 October 1922. He attended Polish primary schools in Kašaliova and Navahrudak. One of his primary teachers, Aliaksandar Orsa (who would later become a prominent figure of the Belarusian diaspora in Germany and the USA as well as the Minister of Education of the Rada of the Belarusian Democratic Republic), recommended Naŭmovič to continue his education in a Polish gymnasium in Navahrudak. Following the Soviet annexation of Western Belarus, Russian became the language of instruction in the gymnasium. Naŭmovič did not speak this language well, did not want to understand and accept the Soviet power, which was the reason of numerous conflicts during his studies. At this time he also started learning painting he showed a great talent for.

On 4 July 1941 Navahrudak was occupied by the Nazis. The Gebit commissar (regional commander) had authorised to open a Belarusian school where Naŭmovič continued his education and which he graduated from in 1944. Along with all other graduates he was issued a diploma featuring the swastika which would pose additional difficulties in higher education and employment afterwards.

== The Belarusian Home Guard and the Anders' Army ==
In 1944 Naŭmovič was conscripted into the Belarusian Home Guard and sent to an officer school in Minsk. However, the German troops had to retreat from Minsk due to the advance of the Soviet army. All the cadets of the school were re-conscripted into the 30th Waffen Grenadier Division of the SS (1st Belarusian) which was also retreating. During a Soviet bombardment of Vilna, Naŭmovič managed to escape from the division to a forest and fled to Besançon, France. In the autumn of 1944 he turned to the French partisans.

Despite an appeal to return to the Soviet Union, Naŭmovič joined the Anders' Army in the end of 1944 because all the cadets of the officer school in Minsk had been sent to prisoner camps in Siberia and such a return would be dangerous.

In June 1945 Naŭmovič relocated to Italy where he worked as a clerk in the court of the 7th Division of the Anders Army.

== Life and death in France ==
In 1947 Naŭmovič was discharged from the Army and moved to Paris where he embarked on an artistic career. Initially, he lived on a stipend from Vatican procured for him and his friends by Archimandrite Leo Garoshka.

Naŭmovič graduated from the Faculty of Sculpture of the Beaux-Arts de Paris in 1953 and a physiotherapeutic school in Paris in 1955. Apart from his artistic career, he taught anatomy and morphology in public and private schools of physiotherapy and arts.

Naŭmovič died on 4 March 2004 in a village near Paris.

== Prominent figure of the Belarusian diaspora ==
Naŭmovič headed the Union of Belarusian Working Emigrants in France (Belarusian: Хаўрус беларускай працоўнай эміграцыі ў Францыі) starting from 1946.

In 1948, together with his friend Janka Filistovič, Naŭmovič established a Belarusian youth organisation in France and started publishing the magazine " Maladość” (“Youth"). Later, he published this magazine together with Leo Garoshka who was also involved in publishing another journal for the Belarusian diaspora, “Božym Šlacham” (“On God’s Highway”).

Between 1949 and 1952 Naŭmovič headed the Belarusian youth organisation, the Union of Belarusian Students, and the Belarusian Union of Combatants.

He also served as a representative in France of the Belarusian Committee of Victims of Radiation established in 1989 within the Belarusian Catholic Mission in London at the initiative of Father Alexander Nadson.

Naŭmovič was a member of the Rada of the Belarusian Democratic Republic.

== Artistic works ==
Naŭmovič is the author of more than ten stone sculptures including the tombstone on Mikola Ravienski's grave, sculptures for churches, the Pont Alexandre III and the Pont Neuf in Paris, as well as the work “The Wedding in Canne of Galileo”. He won a competition for the creation of a statue of Joan of Ark. He illustrated several books written by Belarusian authors and published outside Belarus in 1950-1960, including “Spadčyna” (“My Heritage”) by Janka Kupala, “Symon-muzyka” (“Symon the Musician”) by Jakub Kolas, “Matčyn dar” (“A Mother's Gift”) by Aliés Harun, the journal “Lia čužych bierahoŭ” (“By Strange Shores”). Naŭmovič also painted with watercolours. He donated several of his works to the Francis Skaryna Belarusian Library and Museum.
