= Francis Skaryna Belarusian Library and Museum =

Library in London, United Kingdom

Coordinates: 51.6162°N 0.1848°W

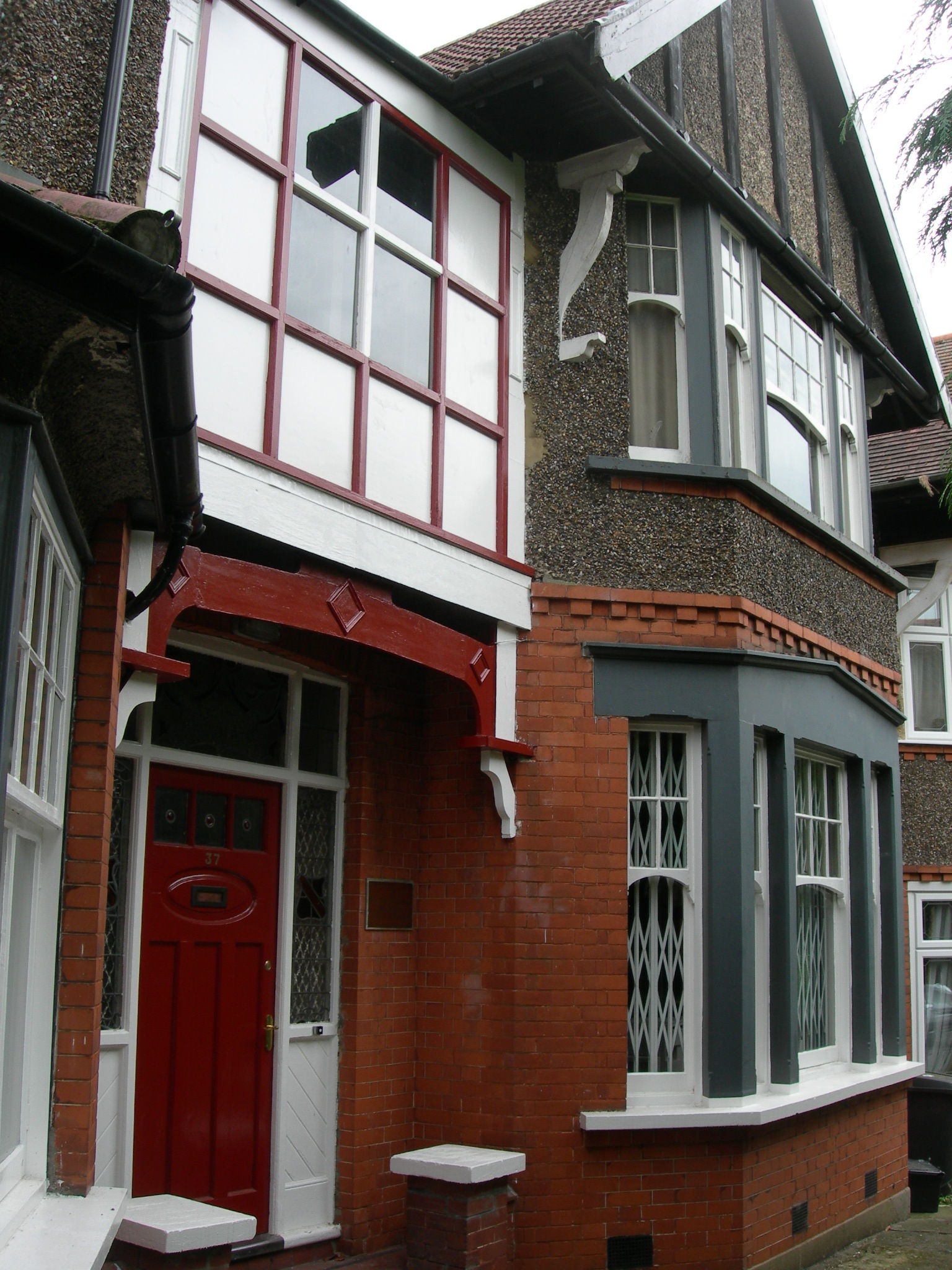
- Location: North Finchley, England
- Type: Research reference, community
- Established: 15 April 1971

Access and use
- Circulation: No lending services
- Population served: Researchers, Belarusian community and anyone interested in Belarus

Other information
- Director: Governed by the Board of Trustees
- Employees: Supported by volunteers
- Website: http://www.skaryna.org

Francis Skaryna Belarusian Library and Museum (Belarusian: Беларуская бібліятэка і музей імя Францішка Скарыны; also referred to as Skaryna Library and Skarynaŭka) in north London, England, is the only library outside Belarus to collect exclusively in the field of Belarusian studies. It was formally established as an independent institution in 1971 and is owned by a charitable trust. The library — alongside the Belarusian Catholic Mission in England, Anglo-Belarusian Society and the Journal of Belarusian Studies — had a significant role in encouraging Belarusian studies in the United Kingdom and outside Belarus in second half of the 20th century.

It is named after Francysk Skaryna, a Belarusian and East-Slavonic publishing pioneer.

== Collections ==
=== Library ===
The book collection is estimated to contain over 30,000 volumes. The strongest areas of the collection are history, literature, language, religion, folklore, local lore, bibliography, music and art. Most of books were published in Belarus and are in Belarusian language, a fair number in Russian and Polish, fewer in German, French and other languages. A collection of the post-World War II Belarusian diaspora publications is one of the most comprehensive in the world.

There are about 20 books produced before 1800, incl. two copies of the Statut of the Grand Dutchy of Lithuania, Alexander Guagnini's Sarmatiae Europeae descriptio, Albert Koialowicz's Historiae Lituanae; a number of New Testaments and liturgical and prayer books published in Belarusian printing houses. This has been supplemented by an extensive collection of Belarusian manuscripts on microfilms purchased from other libraries and museums.

From 1950s, the Belarusian Catholic Mission in England subscribed to the main Soviet Belarus periodicals in Belarusian language. They became part of the Francis Skaryna Belarusian Library and Museum collection, alongside nearly 200 other periodical publications from western Belarus and the Belarusian diaspora.

The cartographic collection consists of over 100 maps from the sixteenth century onwards.

The collection of Belarusian music records on LPs is comprehensive. In 1990-2000s, records on cassettes and CDs were collected episodically, with the emphasis on folk, rock and classical music.

=== Archive ===
The archive contains Church documents of the 18 and 19th centuries, materials dating from the period of the Belarusian Democratic Republic (1918), archives of organisations and personalities in the Belarusian diaspora from around the world. It owns several dozens of manuscripts from 15th century onwards. A collection of photographs, mainly related to the Belarusian life in the United Kingdom and some other countries, is extensive.

=== Museum ===
The museum collection is occupying one room of the Francis Skaryna Belarusian Library and Museum building. Its collection contains examples of the 18th-century Słuckija pajasy woven with gold and silk thread and a priest's chasuble made of these and similar girdles from Hrodna. There is a small collection of coins from the Grand Duchy of Lithuania temporary banknotes issued in 1918 by the local authorities in Słuck, Mahilioŭ and Homieĺ in the absence of central government. There is also a collection of postage stamps issued in Belarus in 1918–22, as well as Soviet stamps with Belarusian motives. There are examples of Belarusian religious art and items which poet Łarysa Hienijuš and Jazep Hiermanovic, a priest, from back from the time of imprisonment in the Soviet concentration camps.

A collection of paintings is housed on the premises of both the library and Belarusian Catholic Mission. It contains works by the Belarusian artists: Boris Zaborov, Kazimir Kastravicki, Piotra Sierhijevič, Viktar Žaŭniarovič, Piotra Miranovič, U. Šymaniec, Michaś Naŭmovič, M. Saŭka-Michaĺski, M. Paŭlouŭski, Hieorhi Papłaŭski and Ivonka Survilla.

== Activities ==
The Francis Skaryna Belarusian Library and Museum is primarily a reference library for researchers. It is open to researchers and guests wishing to visit it for a tour on request. For visiting researchers, the library offers accommodation and visa support.

The library hosts public lectures, online events, Wikipedia edit-a-thons and the Belarusian readers' group (a book club). It is a co-organiser of the annual Conference on Belarusian studies.

== History ==
The history of the Library collection began with the establishment of the Belarusian Catholic Mission in London in 1947 and its move to Marian House on Holden Avenue in the following year. There, a small (two to three hundred) but valuable collection of Belarusian books brought to England by Fr Česlaus Sipovič was housed in the southward-facing room on the first floor, immediately above the Mission's chapel. The Library served as a study centre and meeting place for the student associations Žyćcio and Ruń, and was used by a number of scholars interested in Belarusian heritage.

In the following decade, the book collection increased tenfold and by 1957 was supplemented by subscriptions to all the main periodicals appearing in the BSSR and Belarusian diaspora. In 1958 it received a name Bibliotheca Alboruthena. In the same year, Fr Leo Garoshka moved from Paris to join the Belarusian Catholic community in London. He brought with him a private library, which included a number of rare books published in western Belarus before the Second World War. This collection was added to the Bibliotheca Alboruthena making it the largest Belarusian library in western Europe. Frequently, the library was receiving further collections and items from visitors and Belarusians around the world. When in 1960 Fr Česlaus Sipovič was appointed Bishop and Apostolic Visitor of Belarusians in 1960, he was succeeded by Fr Leo Garoshka as the Bibliotheca Alboruthena's librarian. In the 1960s, there was made the first attempt to catalogue the collection.

In 1968 the book collection was over 6,500 volumes and growing on the account of developing interest to the Belarusian Studies in British universities. In these circumstances it was decided to purchase a whole building to house the library collection (except the religious books not relevant to the Belarusian studies), its archive, as well as the small museum housed, since 1967, in the adjusted building of the St Cyril's Belarusian school. In 1969, Ceslaus Sipovich, Auberon Herbert, and Paval Navara organised a successful fundraising campaign which allowed the acquisition of a building in North London to house the collection.

The library was formally opened on 15 May 1971. Before that, in January 1971, Fr Alexander Nadson assumed the role of librarian instead of Fr Leo Garoshka appointed Director of the Belarusian service of the Vatican Radio. Initially the library was directed by a board of governors. In 1979, the Library was registered as a Charitable Trust governed by a board of trustees appointed from among members of the Belarusian Catholic (Fr Alexander Nadson, Fr Felix Žurnia) and Orthodox (Fr J. Piekarski) clergy, representatives of the Belarusian community in Britain (P. Asipovich, J. Dominik, J. Michaluk) and British scholars with a special interest in Belarusian studies (Jim Dingley, Arnold McMillin, Guy Picarda). Bishop Česlaus Sipovič remained its Chair until his death in 1981; he was succeeded by Fr Alexander Nadson. Peter Mayo was appointed a Trustee to succeed Fr Žurnia who died in 1982.

The institution was conceived as a reference library for supporting Belarus-related research; its chief aim was defined as "to collect all material, both in printed and manuscript forms, relating to Byelorussia, and to make it accessible to all those interested in any aspect of Byelorussian studies". By 1991, it acquired over 12,000 titles with an annual increase of 300-400. It was receiving practically all Belarusian publications, as well as those relating to Belarus, which appeared in BSSR, Poland and the West. In 1990, the Library established an exchange agreement with the Belarusian Academy of Sciences Library, Minsk, which allowed it to receive duplicate copies of publications of the 1920s and 1930s - otherwise unobtainable - in exchange for expensive scholar publications from the West. Its holdings were also enriched considerably by systematic search for old and out-of-print publications and by numerous gifts and bequests from various benefactors. Most books were in Belarusian, but with a considerable number of works in other languages, in particular Polish and Russian. An extensive collection of microfilms and microfiche was also acquired. For the large part of the 1990s and 2000s, Prof Adam Maldzis (Minsk) singlehandedly supplied the Library with books and periodicals appearing in Belarus. This was the period of booming publishing in Belarus; eventually, it became impossible to collect all Belarus-related publications appearing worldwide.

The library has organised several international seminars and conferences in Belarusian studies.

As the health of Fr Alexander Nadson, the long-standing head of the board of trustees and primary keeper of the institution, started deteriorating, the Francis Skaryna Belarusian Library and Museum entered the period of decline. It was removed from the list of charitable organisations in 2011 for the lack of activities. In 2014, the Board of Trustees reconvened to revive the institution and ensure its future. The Mission Statement and Aims were adopted revising, for the first time since 1971, the initial aims of the institution: in addition to collecting and preservation of the Belarusian cultural heritage, and supporting the Belarusian studies - to contribute to the life of the Belarusian community in Britain and encourage interest in Belarus among the British public. In 2015, as a confirmation of its revival and important place in the life of the British society, the institution received a new charity registration.

Since then, it began a programme of cataloguing and digitisation of its most valuable and rare books and items, series of events and collaborative working with other institutions in Belarus and other countries.

== Image gallery ==
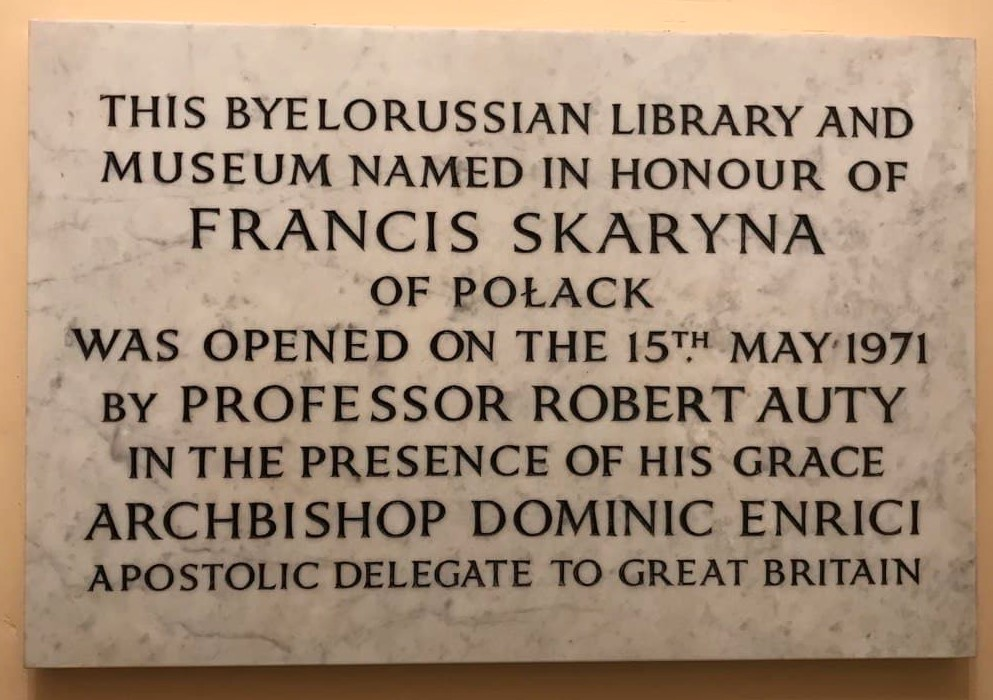
The plaque at the Library's entrance commemorating its opening by Robert Auty in 1971

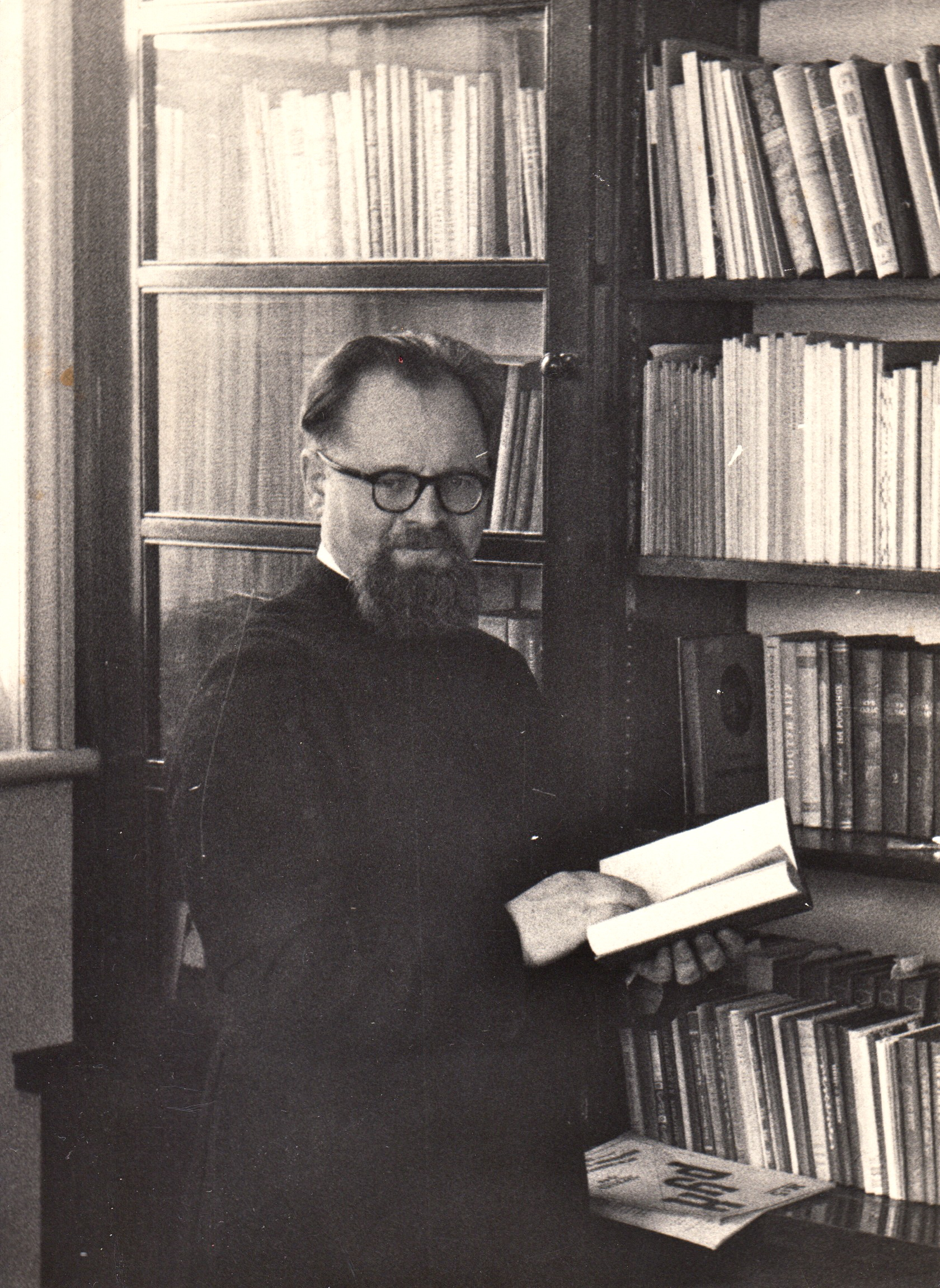
Bishop Ceslaus Sipovich, one of the founders of the institution

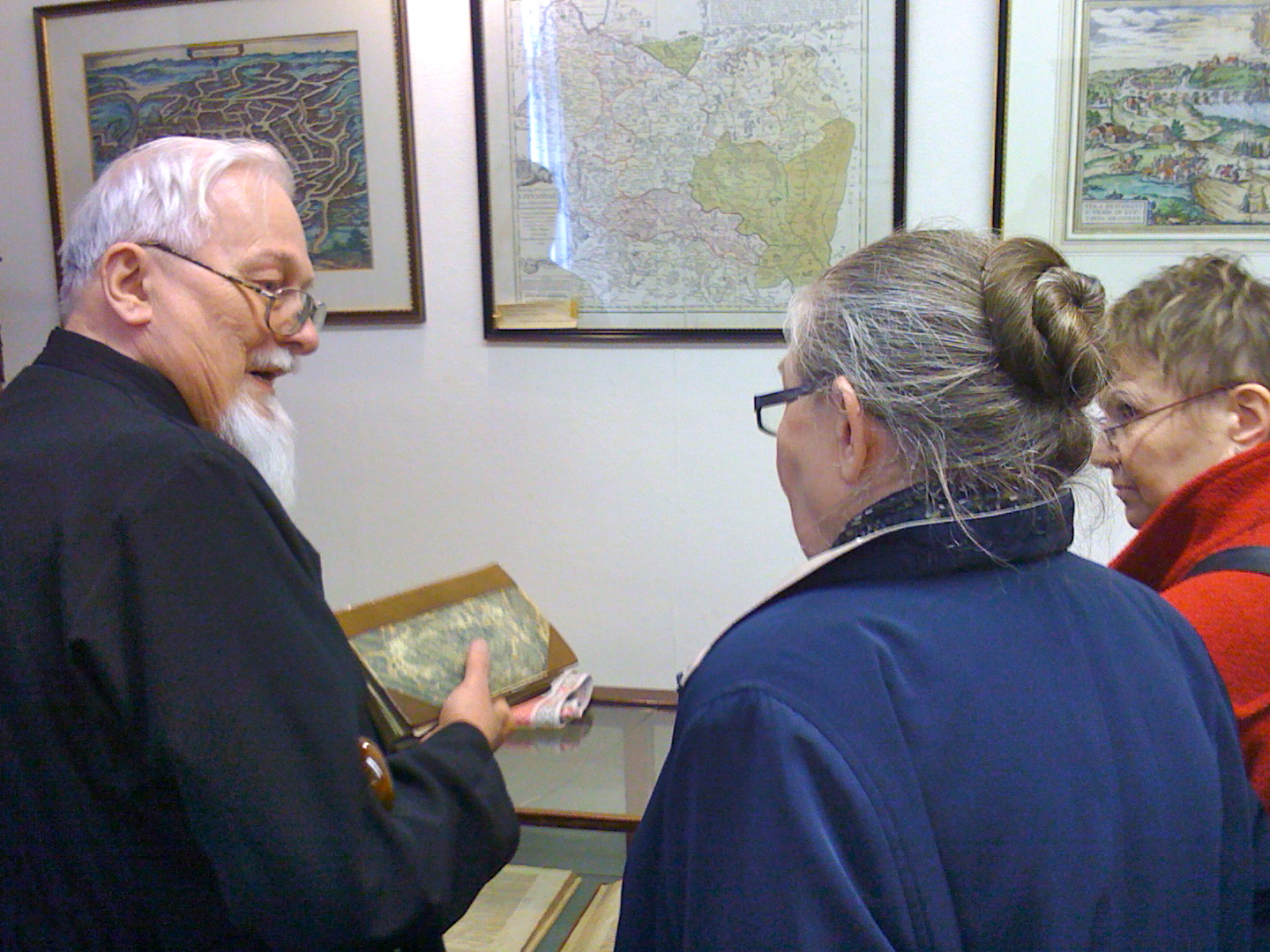
Fr Alexander Nadson and Ivonka Survilla, 2010

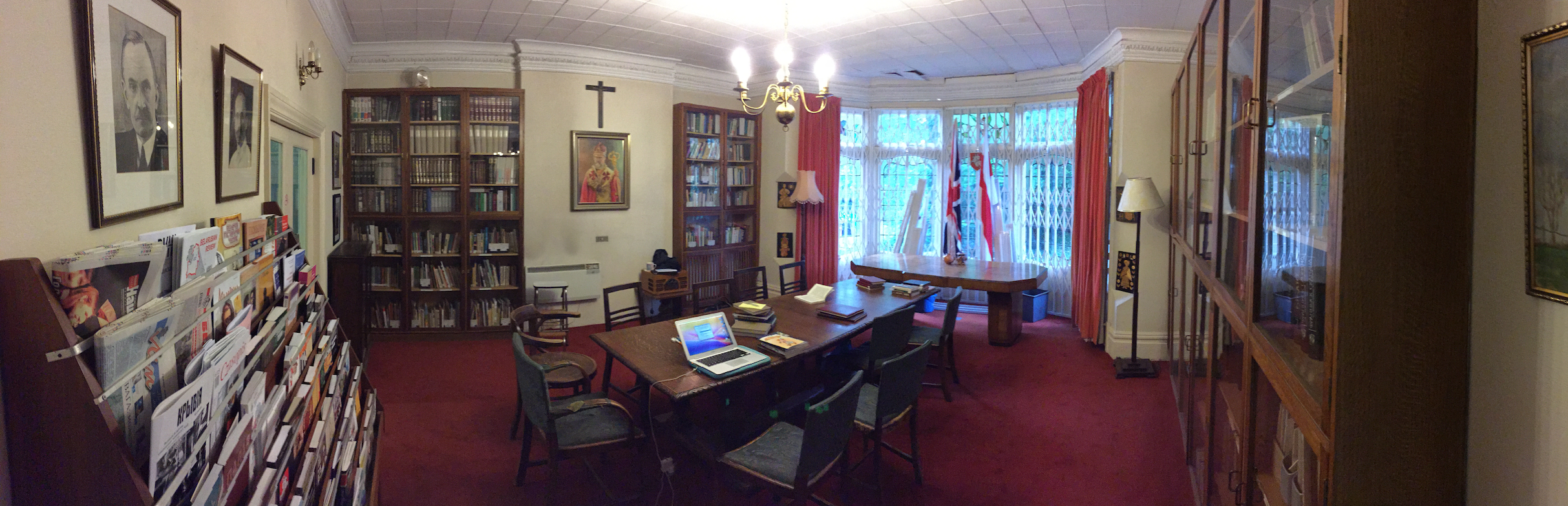

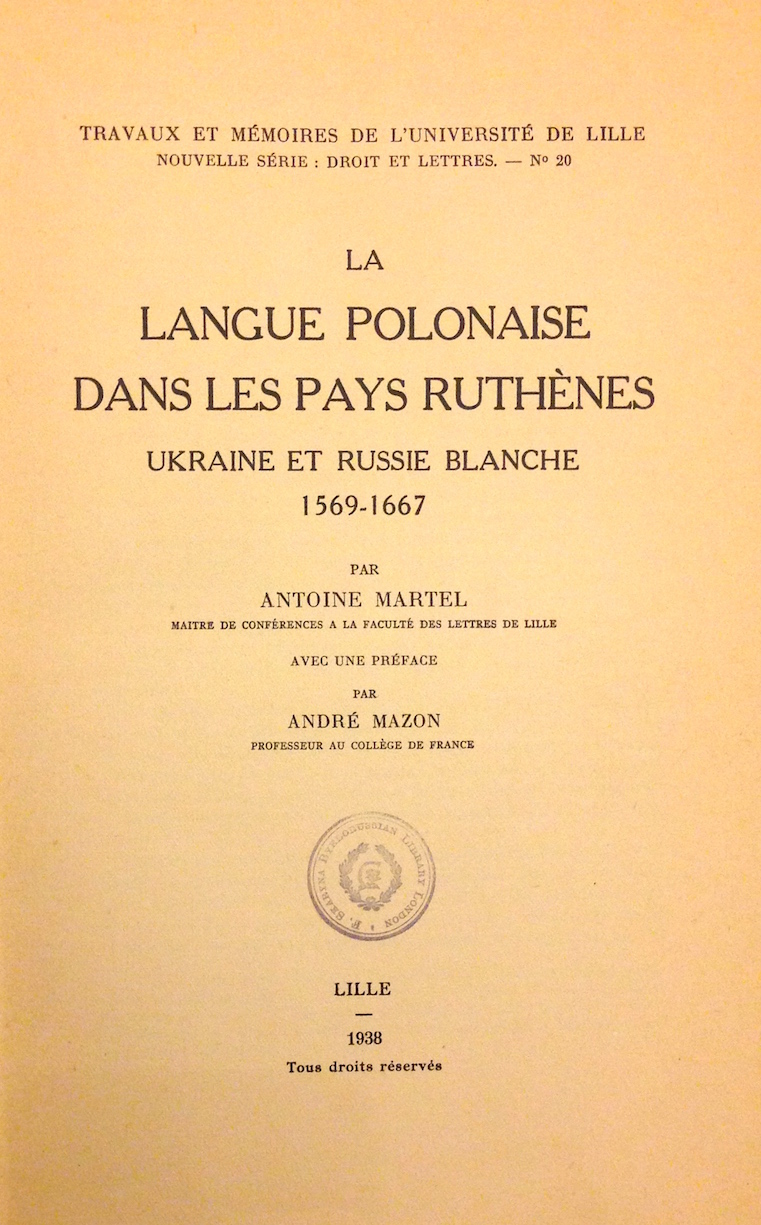
A book featuring the Library's stamp

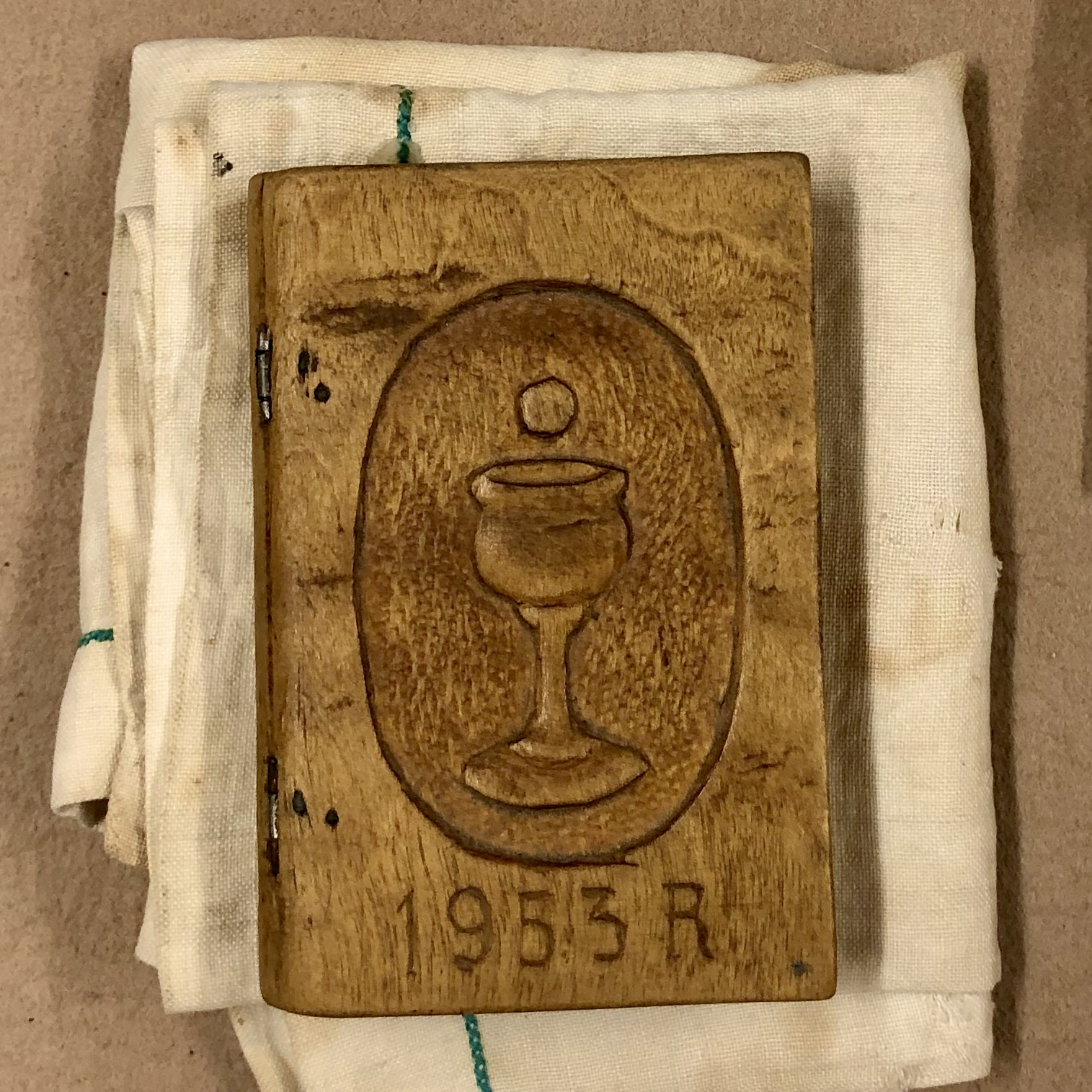
Jazep Hermanovič's box for the Eucharist which the priest used in a USSR concentration camp. On display in the Museum collection.

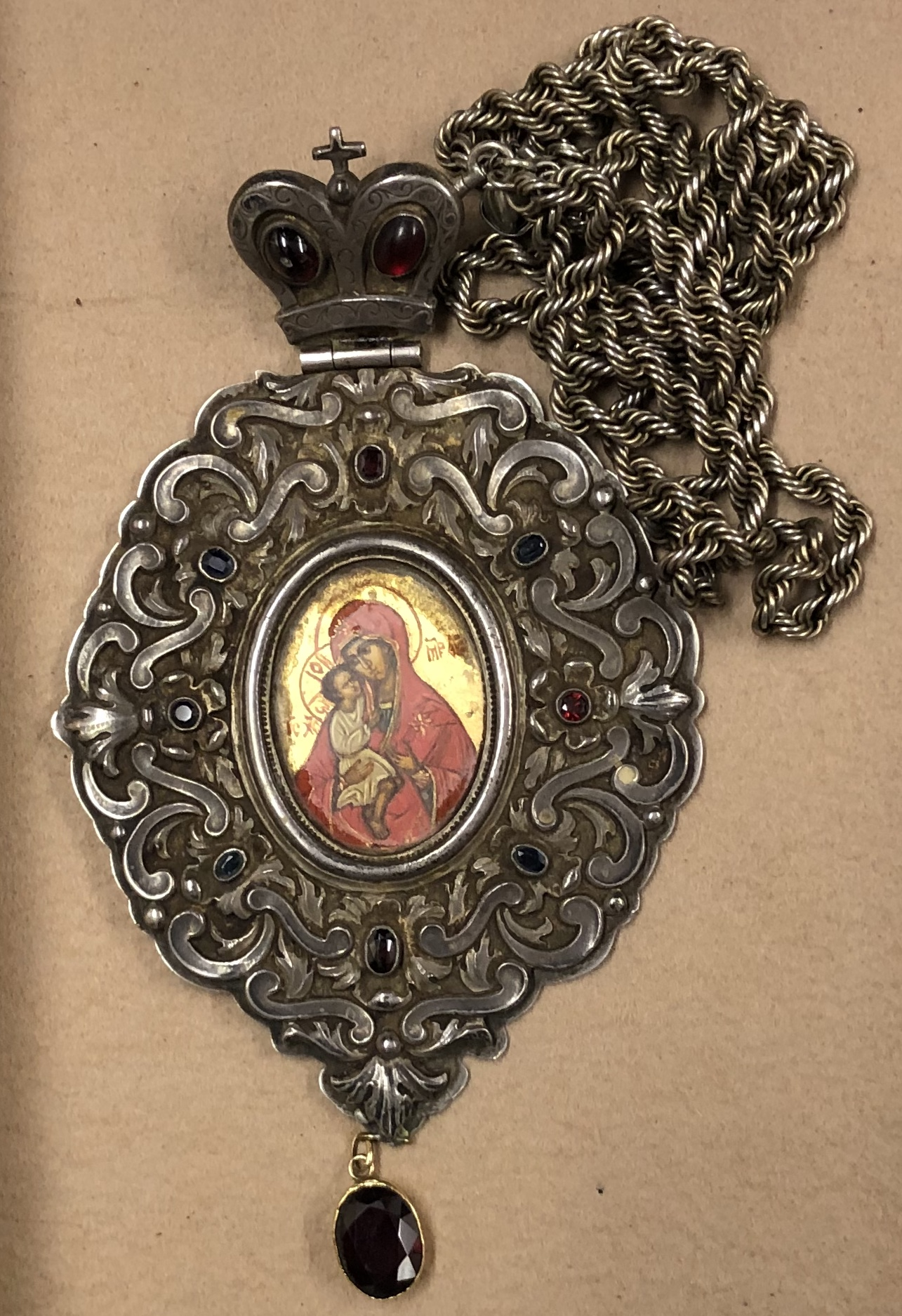
Bishop Ceslaus Sipovich's engolpion in on display in the Museum collection

== See also ==
- Belarusians in the United Kingdom
