= Mariamme =

- Location within Syria
- 34.756944°N 36.294444°E
- Location: Syria
- Region: Homs Governorate

Mariamme was a city in the late Roman province of Syria I, corresponding to present-day Qal'at El-Hosn or Krak des Chevaliers.

Hecataeus of Miletus is quoted by Stephanus of Byzantium describing Mariamme as a Phoenician city. Arrian mentions Mariamme as a city under the dominion of the king of Arwad in the time of Alexander the Great.

The bishopric of Mariamme is no longer a residential episcopal see and is therefore included in the Catholic Church's list of titular sees.

The first titular bishop was appointed to the see in 1923 in the person of Martín Rucker Sotomayor, who had been named the Apostolic Vicar for the Vicariate Apostolic of Tarapacá in Chile.

The current holder of the title is Kuriakose Osthatheos, the apostolic visitor for Malankara Catholics in Europe.

Previous titular bishops include Ceslaus Sipovich.
