= Novogrudok district =

District of Grodno region, Belarus

Novogrudok district Навагрудскі раён (Belarusian) Новогрудский район (Russian)
- District
- Flag Coat of arms

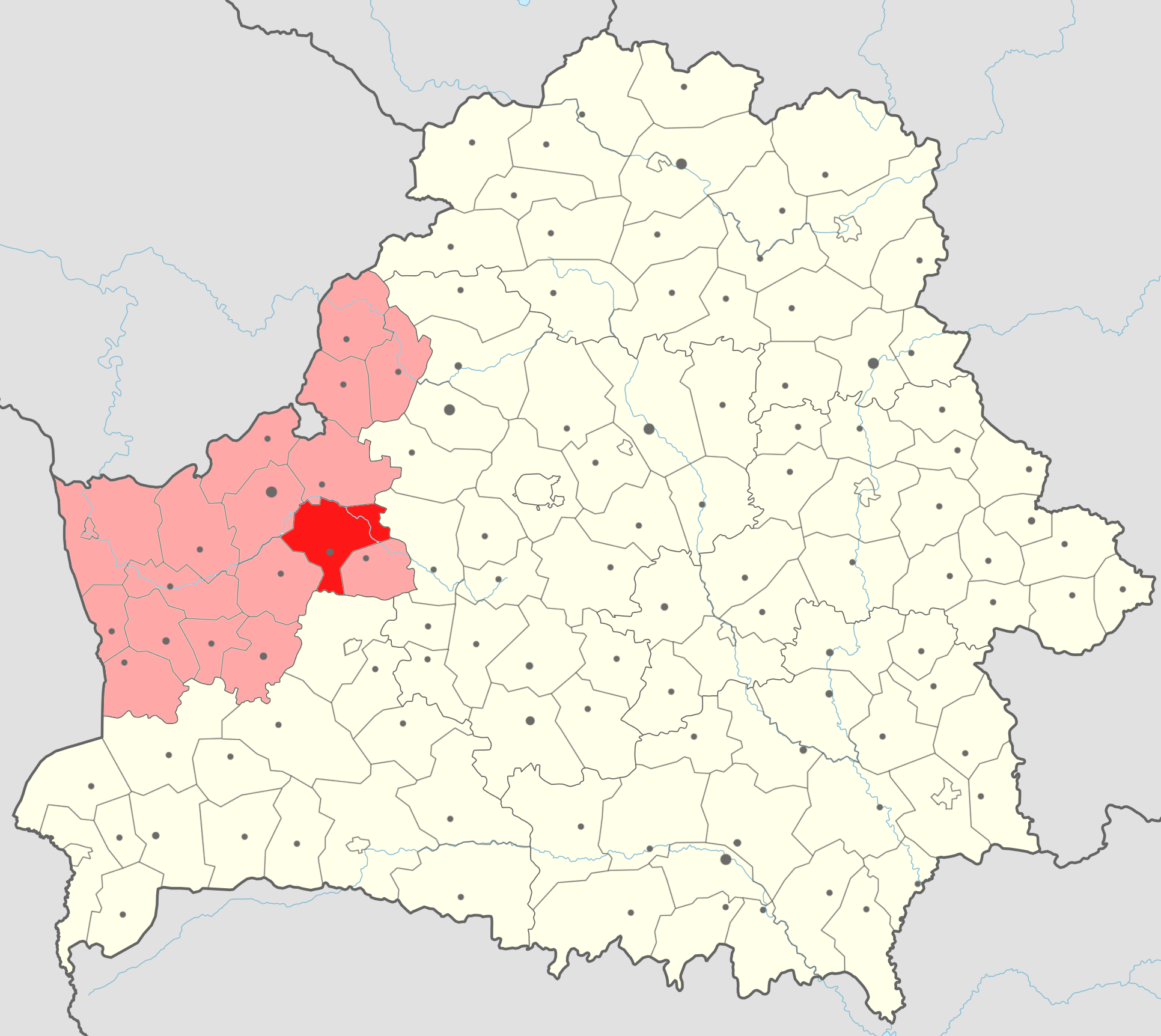
- Coordinates: 53.5833°N 25.8167°E
- Country: Belarus
- Region: Grodno region
- Administrative center: Novogrudok

Area
  - District: 1,668.01 km^{2} (644.02 sq mi)

Population (2024)
  - District: 40,761
  - Density: 24.437/km^{2} (63.291/sq mi)
  - Urban: 28,924
  - Rural: 11,837
- Time zone: UTC+3 (MSK)

Novogrudok district or Navahrudak district (Belarusian: Навагрудскі раён, romanized: Navahrudski rajon; Russian: Новогрудский район, romanized: Novogrudsky rayon) is a district (raion) of Grodno region in Belarus. The administrative center is Novogrudok. As of 2024, it has a population of 40,761.

== Notable residents ==
- Fabijan Abrantovič (1884, Vieraskava village – 1946), religious and civic leader of the first half of the 20th century, victim of the Soviet repressions
- Uladzimir Konan (1934, Vieraskava village - 2011), Belarusian philosopher
- Michaś Naŭmovič (1922, Kašaliova village - 2004), French artist, member of the Rada of the Belarusian Democratic Republic
- Paval Navara (1927, Kupisk village - 1983), Belarusian émigré public figure and a co-founder of the Anglo-Belarusian Society
- Jazep Sažyč (1917, Haradzečna village – 2007), political figure, President of the Rada of the Belarusian Democratic Republic
