= Alexander Nadson =

Belarusian Greek priest and historian (1926–2015)

- Аляксандар Надсан
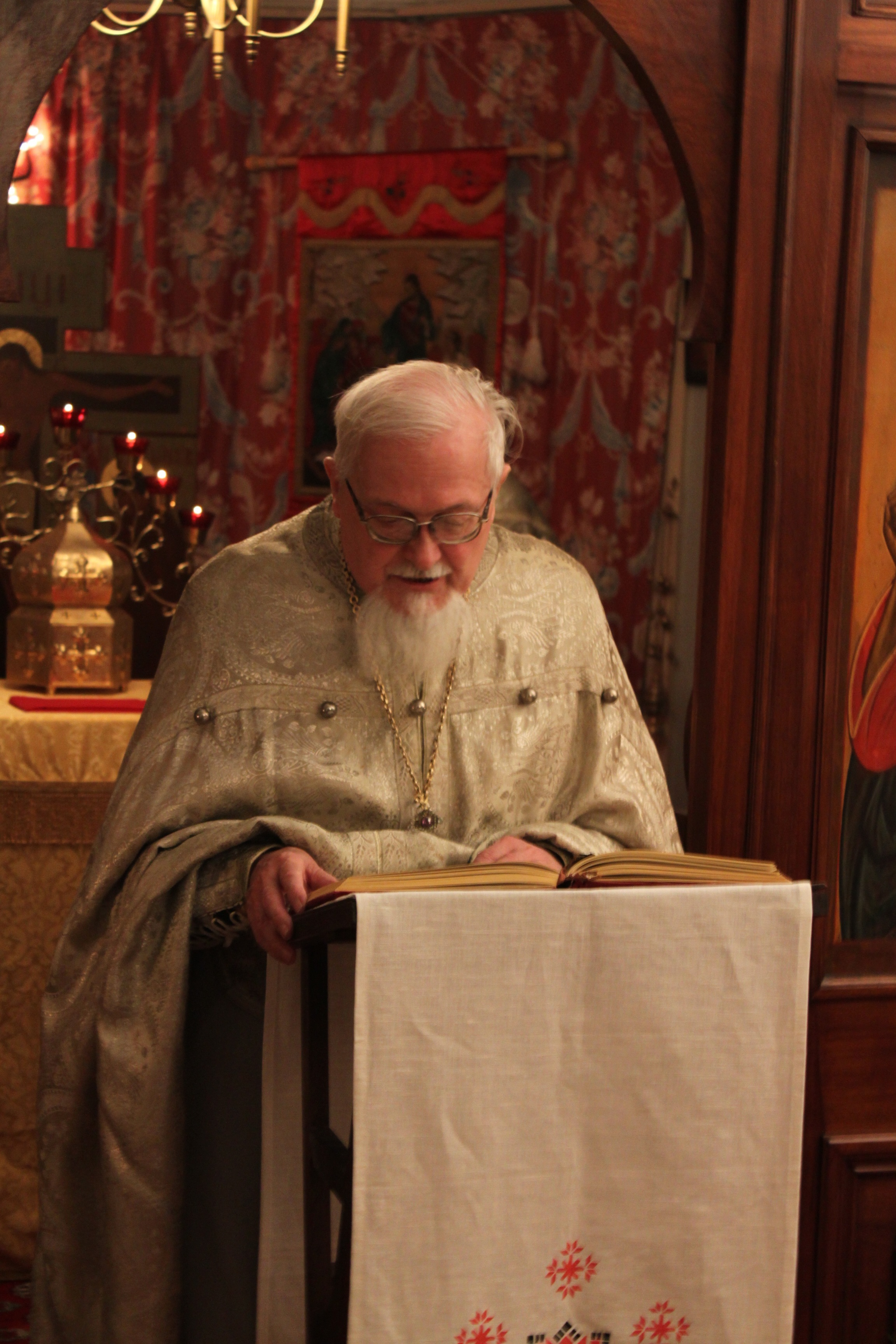
- Nadson in 2009
- Born: Aliaksandar Bočka; 8 August 1926; Haradzyeya, Second Polish Republic (now Belarus)
- Died: 15 April 2015 (aged 88); London, United Kingdom
- Occupations: priest; historian

Alexander Antonovich Nadson (Belarusian: Аляксандар Антонавіч Надсан, romanized: Aliaksandar Antonavich Nadsan; 8 August 1926 – 15 April 2015) was the Apostolic Visitor for Belarusian Greek-Catholic faithful abroad, scholar, translator and a notable Belarusian émigré social and religious leader.

== Early life ==
Fr Nadson was born Alyaksandar Bochka (Belarusian: Аляксандар Бочка, romanized: Aliaksandar Bočka) in the village of Haradzyeya near Nyasvizh, in the Second Polish Republic (now in Minsk Region, Belarus) into a middle-class family. His father Anton had served as an officer in the army of the Russian tsar in World War I, and had participated in the 1920 anti-Bolshevik Slutsk Uprising. Nadson studied at the Teacher Training College in Nyasvizh seminary. In 1944, he emigrated from Belarus, and in 1945 was a soldier in the 2nd Polish Corps fighting in Italy, where he was wounded.

In 1946, along with the Anders army he moved to Great Britain where he studied at the University of London. Nadson was one of the founders of the Association of Belarusians in Great Britain and its chairman from 1951 to 1953. He was editor of the periodicals Biełarus na čužynie and Na šlachu, and took part in the activities of the Belarusian Christian academic society Ruń and the Belarusian People's Independent Christian Movement.

== Later life ==
From autumn 1953, he studied at the Pontifical Greek College in Rome. He was ordained priest of the Eastern Rite on 23 November 1958. Nadson "had been guided on to this [ecclesiastical] path by (later Bishop) Ceslaus Sipovich, who himself had been sent by the Vatican to establish a Belarusian Catholic Mission in the UK". In July 1959, Nadson returned to London, where he resumed his activities in organizations of the Belarusian diaspora. It was at this time that the "Belarusian village" in North Finchley, London was beginning to expand. A property was acquired to house a boarding school for the sons of Belarusian immigrants in Western Europe; he was appointed headmaster in 1961.

From 1971 Nadson was the director of the Francis Skaryna Belarusian Library and Museum in London, the largest Belarusian library abroad. Nadson "developed the institution to the point where it could justifiably be regarded as the foremost collection in the world, outside Belarus itself, of books (including many rare publications), maps, journals and artefacts relevant for the study of the complex area east of Poland once known as the Grand Duchy of Lithuania" with "a world-wide reputation" which "attract[ed] scholars from a wide range of countries".

The library also provided Nadson with many opportunities for research. He gave several lectures to the Anglo-Belarusian Society. He published pioneering articles in the Society's Journal of Belarusian Studies on such topics as the life and writings of the early Belarusian Saint Cyril of Turau and a manuscript tefsir (a commentary on the Qur’an) that he had acquired for the library, written in Arabic script by Muslim Tatars living in Belarus who had retained their religion but used Belarusian as their everyday language. He was also a long time editor of the Journal. The high regard in which his scholarship was held was shown by the award in 2008 of an honorary doctorate of the European Humanities University based in Vilnius. Nadson also translated liturgical texts into Belarusian.

From 1981, he was head of the Belarusian Catholic mission in Great Britain, and from 1986, Apostolic Visitor to all Belarusian Greek-Catholic faithful abroad. He actively supported the recreation of the Greek Catholic Church in Belarus that had been suppressed in that country since the 1830s.

He was the author of several books on the history of Belarus and the head of a Chernobyl charity fund aimed at alleviating the effects of the Chernobyl nuclear disaster of 1986.

== Death ==
Nadson died in London on 15 April 2015, aged 88, and is buried in St Pancras and Islington Cemetery in East Finchley, North London.
