= Leo Garoshka =

Belarusian Greek Catholic priest, activist, and historian

Archimandrite Leo Haroshka
- Леў Гарошка
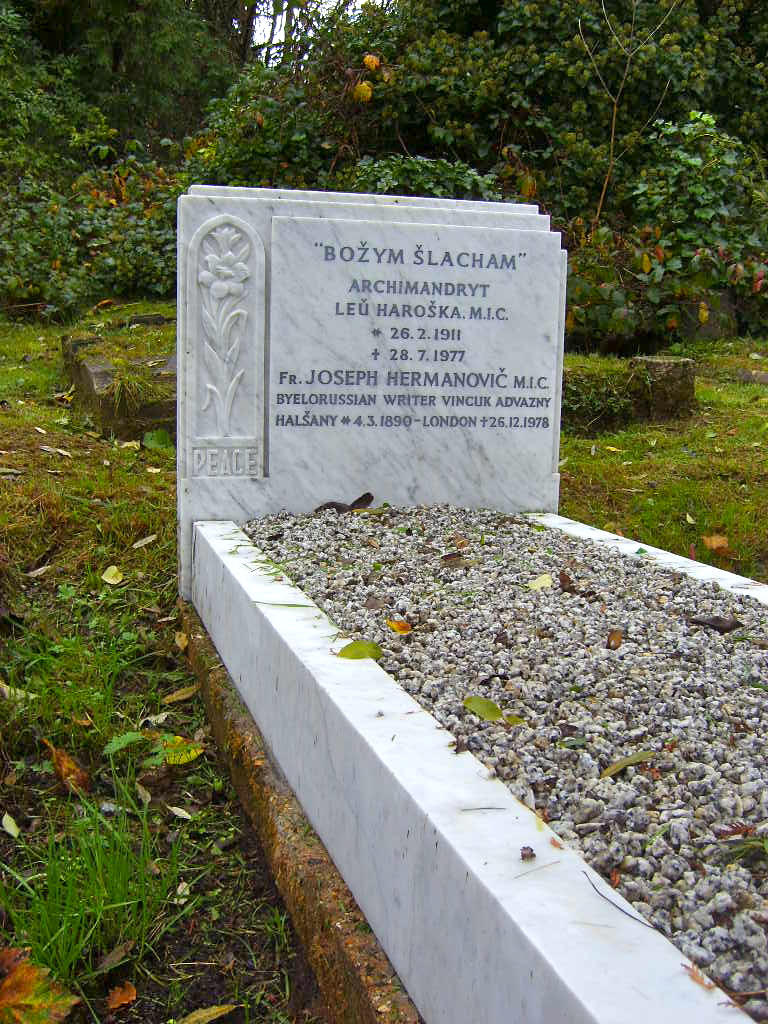
- Haroshka's grave in St Pancras and Islington Cemetery in London
- Born: 26 February 1911; Traščycy, Hrodna Province, Russian Empire (now - Belarus)
- Died: 8 August 1977 (aged 66); Paris, France
- Resting place: St Pancras and Islington Cemetery, London
- Occupations: priest, researcher

Archimandrite Leo Haroshka, MIC (born Leŭ Jurjevič Haroška, Belarusian: Леў Юр’евіч Гарошка, Russian: Лев Юрьевич Горошко; 26 February 1911, the village of Traščycy, Hrodna Province, Russian Empire (nowadays Karelichy District Hrodna Region, Belarus) - 8 August 1977, Paris, France) was a Belarusian Catholic priest of the Byzantine rite, religious and social activist, researcher of the history of religion in Belarus and one of the founders of the Francis Skaryna Belarusian Library in London. His pseudonyms are LA Іskra, Anatoí Žmienia, Prakop Cavalieri and others.

== Early life ==
Haroshka was born into a poor Orthodox family with Uniate roots. He studied at the Navahrudak Belarusian school, after in 1936 in the Ukrainian Catholic University, and then went to study in Innsbruck, however, due to insufficient knowledge of the Latin language was not able to continue studies.

Already a Catholic, he was ordained in Lviv in 1937, and he served as a Greek Catholic priest in Pinsk. In 1942 exarch Anton Niemancevič appointed him to the Board of Governors of the re-established Belarusian Greek-Catholic Church. He worked as a teacher and took part in the All-Belarusian Congress in Minsk in 1944.

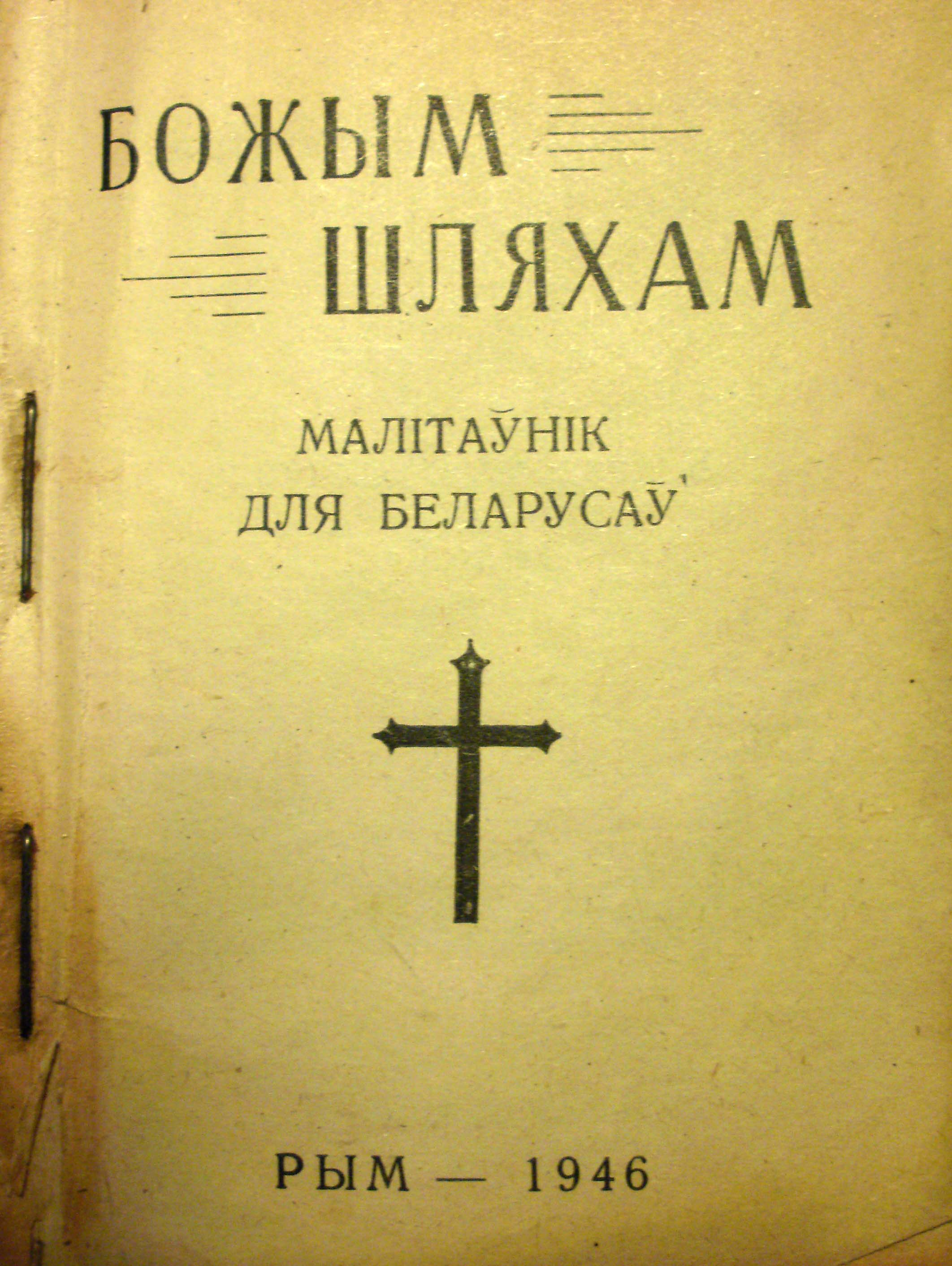
Prayer book in Belarusian published in 1946 in Rome by Leo Haroshka

== Life in exile ==
From 1944 he was in exile; in 1946 he was appointed head of the Belarusian Catholic Mission in France. Haroshka published a magazine Божым Шляхам (Božym Šliacham, "God's Way") and several religious brochures. In 1959 he joined the Order of Marian.

In 1960 Bishop Ceslaus Sipovich appointed him rector of the Belarusian Catholic Mission in the United Kingdom. He joined the Association of Belarusians in Great Britain and served as its board member and deputy chair.

Haroshka's sizeable and valuable book collection became one of the building blocks of the Francis Skaryna Belarusian Library in London, which was initiated with his involvement in 1969 and officially opened in 1971.

From 1970 he lived in Rome and headed the Belarusian section of Vatican Radio.

== Death ==
Haroshka died on 8 August 1977 in Paris while undergoing surgery. He is buried at the St Pancras and Islington cemetery in North London alongside a number of other prominent Belarusian figures.

== Notable works ==
Garoshka's academic works cover multiple areas and include:

- philosophical and theological "Soul" ("Душа") (1948)
- scientific "The Origins of man in the light of modern facts" ("Паходжаньне чалавека ў сьвятле сучасных фактаў") (1948)
- historic "St Euphrosyne–Pradslava of Polatsk. A patron of Belarus" (Сьв. Ефрасіньня-Прадслава Полацкая. Патронка Беларусі) (1950),
- historic "Belarus in dates, numbers and facts" ("Беларусь у датах, лічбах, фактах") (1953),
- linguistic "Distinct characteristics of the Belarusian language" ("Своеасаблівасьці беларускае мовы") (1951)
- historic {{lang|be|Under the sign of 'Russian' and 'Polish' faiths" ("Пад знакам „рускае“ і „польскае“ веры") (1954/55)
- historic "The causes of Polonisation in Belarus" ("Прычыны паланізацыі на Беларусі") (1955)
- a Greek–Latin–Church Slavonic–Belarusian dictionary
- a compilation of Belarusian sayings and proverbs with over 20000 entries.

Apart from the academic papers, he wrote dozens of stories under pen-name Anatoí Žmienia.
