= Ceslaus Sipovich =

Belarusian Greek Catholic bishop and émigré

- Titular bishop of Mariamme; Superior General Emeritus of Congregation of Marian Fathers of the Immaculate Conception of the Most Blessed Virgin Mary
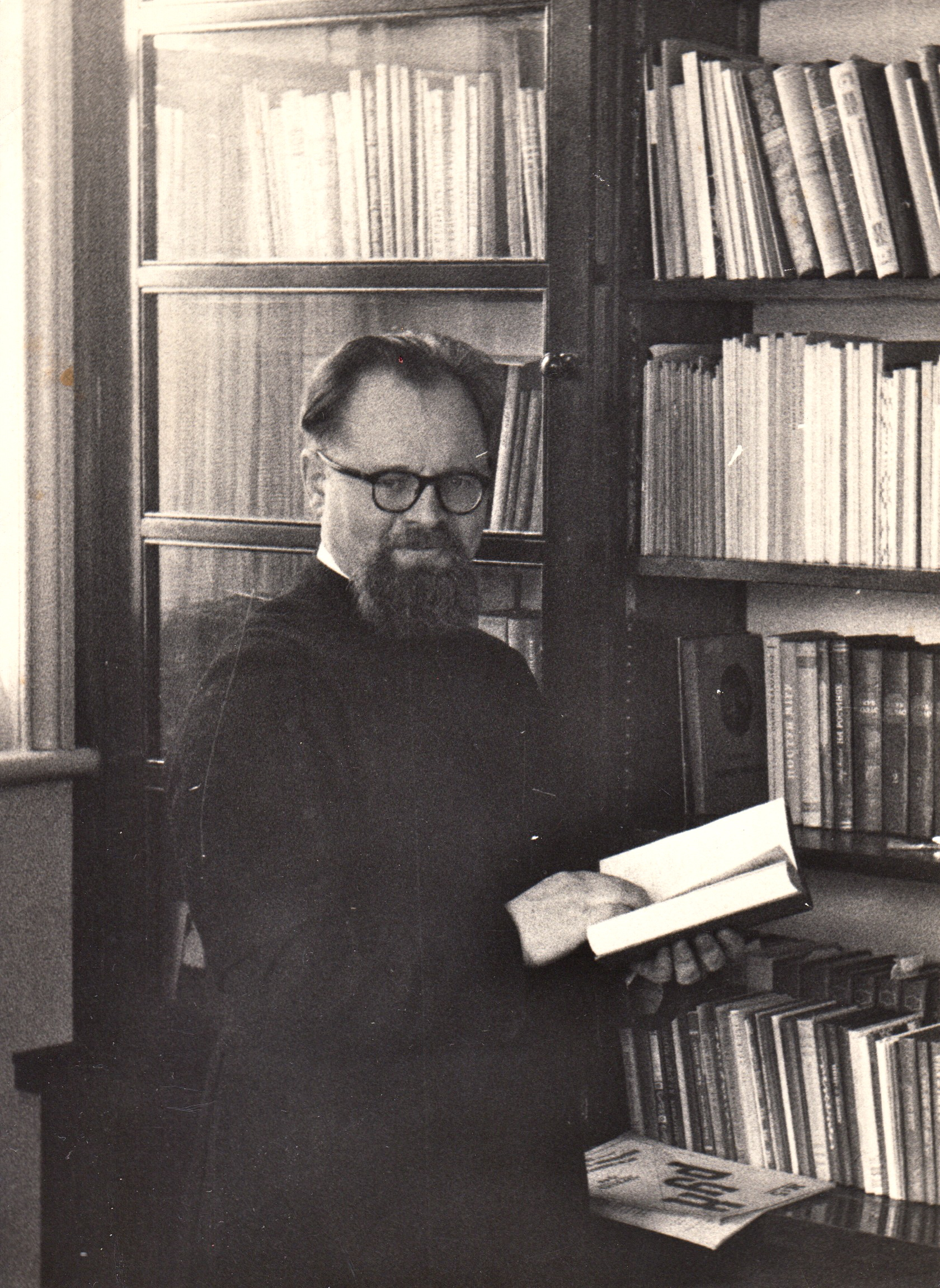
- Native name: Чэслаў Сіповіч
- Church: Catholic Church

Orders
- Consecration: 1960

Personal details
- Born: 8 December 1914 near Braslaŭ, Russian Empire (now - Belarus)
- Died: 4 October 1981 (aged 66) London, United Kingdom
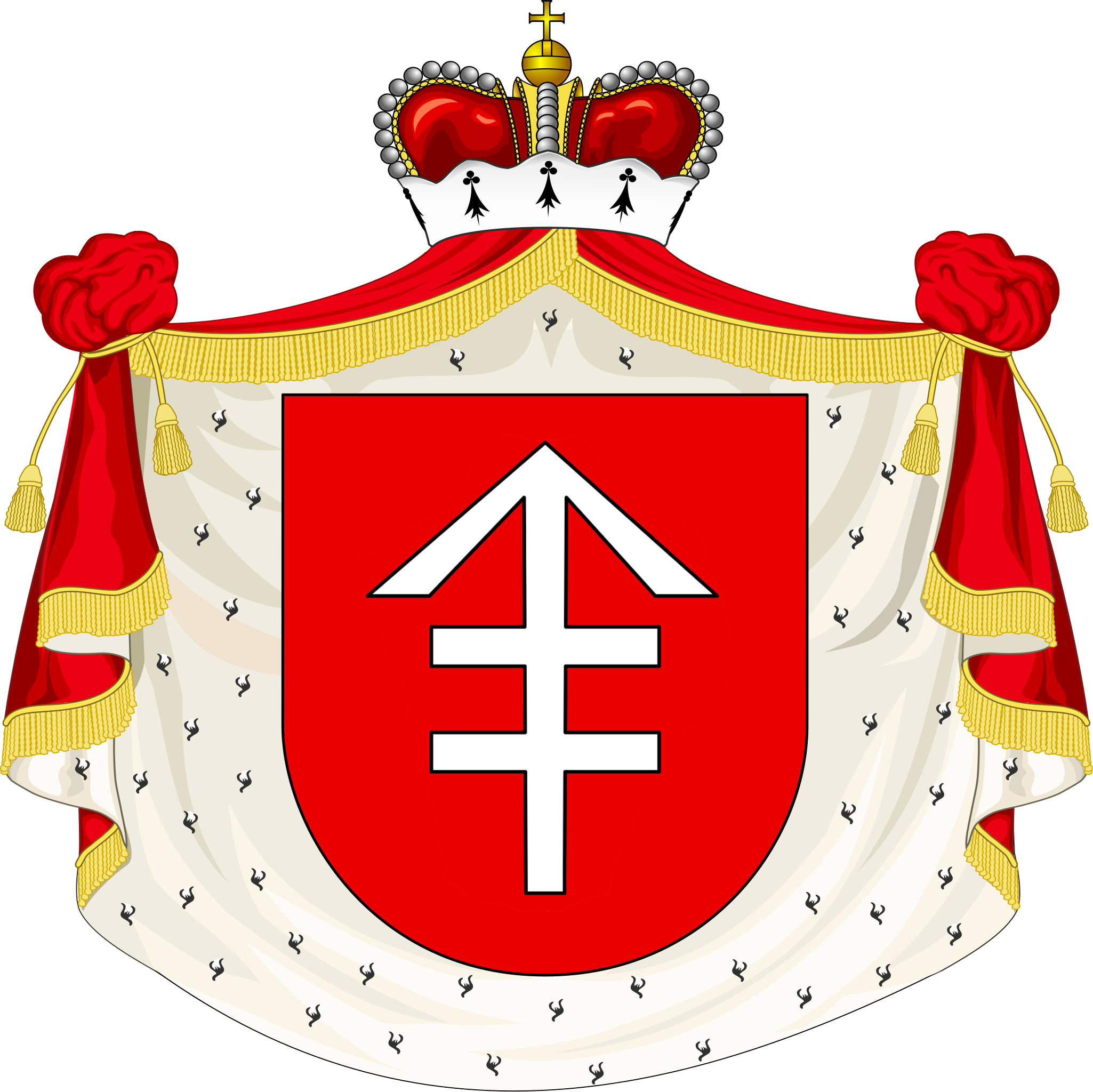
- Coat of arms

Ceslaus Sipovich (Belarusian: Чэслаў Вінцэнтавіч Сіповіч, Łacinka: Česłaǔ Sipovič) (8 December 1914 – 4 October 1981) was a bishop of the Belarusian Greek Catholic Church, a titular bishop of Mariamme, and a notable Belarusian émigré social and religious leader.

== Early life ==
Bishop Sipovich was born on 8 December 1914 into a large farming family in the village of Dziedzinka, Braslau District, Kovno Province of the Russian Empire (nowadays Mijory District, Viciebsk Region of Belarus). He felt a priesthood vocation from an early age while attending catholic school in Druja.

In 1935 Sipovich went to University of Wilno to read Philosophy and Theology followed by studies at the Pontifical Greek College in Rome between 1938-1942. In 1940 he was ordained a priest in the Greek-Catholic rite. In 1946 he obtained his doctorate from the Pontifical Oriental Institute.

== Later life in Britain ==
In 1947 Sipovich moved to Great Britain to serve the spiritual needs of thousands of ethnic Belarusians (mainly former soldiers of the Polish Anders Army) who settled there after World War II. He joined the recently founded Association of Belarusians in Great Britain and was involved in refugee welfare work.

On 27 October 1947 the Belarusian Catholic Mission in North London (the precursor of Church of St Cyril of Turau and All the Patron Saints of the Belarusian People) was established, with Fr Sipovich as its first Rector.

In 1954 the Anglo-Belarusian Society was founded, one of its founders was Fr Sipovich. At that time, he also revived the Society of St John Chrysostom, an organisation devoted to promoting a better knowledge and understanding of Eastern Christianity among English-speaking people.

He was appointed titular bishop of Mariamme in 1960, making him the first bishop in the Belarusian Greek Catholic Church since its criminalization by Bishop Joseph Semashko and the Russian imperial authorities in the 1830s. Bishop Sipovich also served as Superior General of the Congregation of Marian Fathers from 1963 to 1969 and was Apostolic Visitor for Belarusian Catholic faithful abroad.

In 1971 he was one of the founders of the Francis Skaryna Belarusian Library in London. Its opening was “an impressive feast of Belarusian culture and a personal triumph for Bishop Sipovich.”

Bishop Sipovich was also involved in academic work in the field of Theology and Church History.

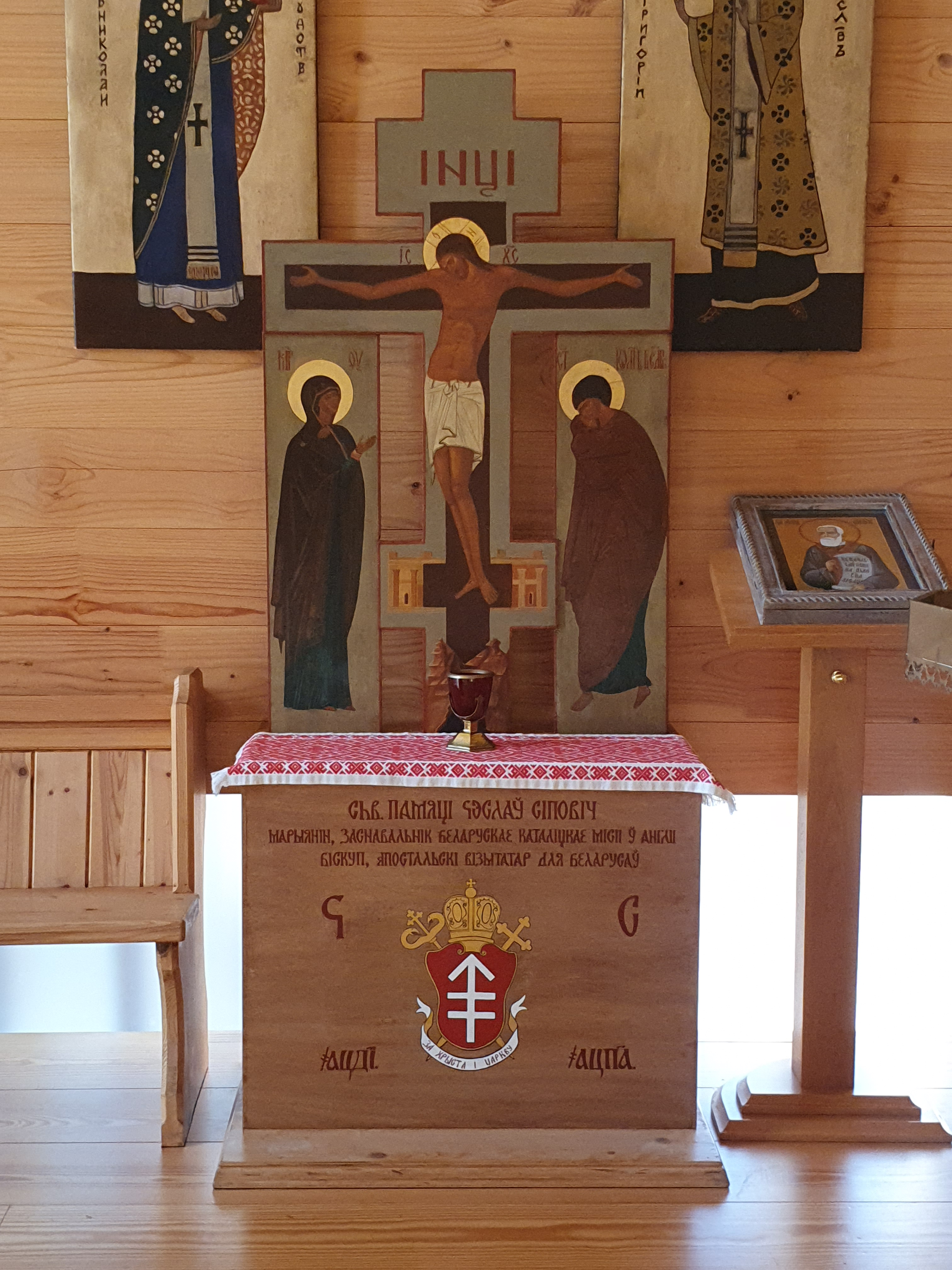
Memorial to bishop Ceslaus Sipovich in the Church of St Cyril of Turau and All the Patron Saints of the Belarusian People in London

== Death ==
Bishop Sipovich died at the age of 67 on 4 October 1981 and is buried in St Pancras and Islington Cemetery in East Finchley, North London.
