= Eva Viežnaviec =

Belarusian author and journalist (1970/1971–2026)

Eva Viežnaviec

Eva Viežnaviec, also Eva Vezhnavets (Belarusian: Ева Вежнавец, Jeva Viežnaviec), real name Sviatłana Stefanaŭna Kurs (Belarusian: Сьвятлана Стэфанаўна Курс; January 9, 1972 – July 20, 2026) was a Belarusian writer.

== Life and career ==
Born on 9 January 1972 in the village of Zahallie (Lyuban district), where she spent her childhood. She was often ill as a child, experienced clinical death, and, by her own recollection, was saved by local village folk healers (šaptuchi).

In 1994 she graduated from the Philology Faculty of Belarusian State University. After her assignment, she worked as a teacher in her home village and as a kindergarten educator, but soon left the education system. In the 1990s she joined the Belarusian national movement, became a member of the BPF, and worked as an intern at Belarusian radio. She actively participated in the life of the Minsk creative bohemia of that time, and was friends with many popular cultural figures such as Anatol Sys, Michal Anempadystaŭ, and Artur Klinaŭ.

In 2006 she moved to Poland to work at Euroradio, where she worked for 13 years. She also collaborated with the Belsat TV channel until 2020.

She has received a scholarship from Thomas Manne House and arrived to California to stay at Villa Aurora for eight months in 2013. She took courses at Santa Monica College and was immensely fascinated by the American culture. She referred to the Americans as "unbeated people" - people, who never knew the yoke of a Lord, like Europeans did.

She lived in Warsaw. As a translator, she collaborated with the Zbigniew Raszewski Theatre Institute in Warsaw (2019). She was a member, author, and translator for Da Teatra Society of Young Creators in Poznań. In 2013, Kurs was a Feuchtwanger Fellow at the Villa Aurora cultural institute in Pacific Palisades in California, which is maintained by the government of Germany.

In 2020, during the COVID-19 pandemic and after losing her job at the radio, she went to work as a social worker (caregiver) — looking after elderly and seriously ill Poles. According to her, she took this step consciously, in order to overcome her own fear of old age and death. Due to her civic activism and the threat of political persecution, she could not return to Belarus after the events of 2020.

In May 2025, Sviatlana Kurs was diagnosed with late-stage cancer. The BYSOL foundation announced an urgent fundraiser for treatment at the National Oncology Center in Warsaw: the required sum of €10,000 was raised by Belarusians in just three hours. The writer underwent chemotherapy and fought the illness for over a year.

Viežnaviec died from cancer in Warsaw in July 2026, aged 54. Eva Viežnaviec’s ashes were transported to Belarus after cremation, a process that was not without difficulties. She was buried in her native village of Boyanichi on August 22, 2026.

== Literary work ==
The writer created the pen name Eva Viežnaviec by combining the name of the foremother of all women with the surname of her school military instructor.

In the first issue of the magazine ARCHE in 1998, her first short story, My Dva Khokhliki (We Two Imps), was published, written at the request of the then-editor of Nasha Niva, Andrej Dyńko. She was a co-author of the collection of theatrical and street happening practices, Svaboda Biez Ciabie (Freedom Without You) (2003).

In 2008 her first collection of short stories Shliakh Drobnai Svolachy (The Path of a Petty Scoundrel) was published, in which the author presented a gallery of atypical female images: strong, resilient heroines who search for themselves and try to survive in harsh realities. The writer herself later regarded her debut critically, calling it "Sins of Youth," full of pathos. In 2015 she published for the first time the short story, Paraska i Yae Chorny Byk (Paraska and Her Black Bull), under her real name.

In 2020, Eva Viežnaviec became one of the two first authors of Svetlana Alexievich's publishing house Pflaŭmbaŭm, within which the novella, Pa Shto Idzesh, Voŭcha? (What Now, Mr. Wolf?) was published. The genre of the work is defined as a swamp fairy tale. The main heroine is a middle-aged alcoholic who cared for other people's elderly on the West and is forced to travel to the funeral of her sorceress grandmother in the Belarusian backwoods, where she delves into the tragic history of her family and country in the 20th century. The author noted that the book is a kind of synopsis of the horrific 20th century and consists of 20–40% autobiographical material. The work received wide resonance and was translated into German, Lithuanian, and Polish. In 2023 the German translation of the book made the shortlist of the International Literature Award of the House of World Cultures (Berlin).

Eva Viežnaviec's prose is characterized by merciless sincerity, an interest in «the filth and blackness of life», naturalism, dense dialectal coloring, as well as a deep reflection on the historical traumas of the Belarusian people.

In 2023 Sviatlana Kurs was a member of the jury of the Jerzy Giedroyc Literary Award.

== Public and political views ==
Sviatlana Kurs was a consistent defender of Belarus's independence and a critic of Russian imperialism. She openly called the Russian cultural project "failed and fascist", believing that the Russian language and literature carry within them a charge of destruction of everything non-Russian. Because of this, in 2025 she had a public correspondence polemic with Nobel laureate Sviatlana Alexievich.

She regularly wrote opinion columns. After the start of the full-scale war in Ukraine, she initiated fundraisers for Belarusian volunteers in Ukraine. She spoke boldly about difficult pages of history, including publicly telling of her NKVD-agent great-grandfather, who sent families to Solovki prison camp and was cursed by fellow villagers for it.

== Books ==
- Шлях дробнай сволачы (2008, short story collection)
- Па што ідзеш, воўча? (2022)
  - Translations:
    - Czech (2023): Pro co si jdeš, vlku?, translated by Maks Ščur
    - German (2023): Was suchst du, Wolf?, translated by Tina Wünschmann
    - Norwegian (2024): Hva leter du etter, ulv?, translated by Marina Hobbel
    - Swedish (2024): Vad söker du, varg?, translated by Krystsina Banduryna and Mikael Nydahl
    - Polish (2025): O wilku mówiono w izbie, translated by Małgorzata Buchalik
    - English (2026): What Now, Mr Wolf?, translated by Ella Dingley and Jim Dingley. Before the published translation, it was variously titled by commenters, What Is It You Seek, Wolf?, What Are You Going for, Wolf?, etc.
    - Latvian (2026): Kam nāci tu, vilks?, translated by Māra Poļakova
    - Lithuanian (2026): Ko ateini, vilke?, translated by Jurgita Jasponytė-Burokienė
    - Spanish (2026): ¿Qué buscas, lobo?, translated by Andréi Kozinets

== Awards and nominations ==
- 2021: Jerzy Giedroyc Literary Award
- 2023: The German translation, Was suchst du, Wolf? was shortlisted for the 2023 International Literature Prize for contemporary foreign prose
