= Classification of extremist materials in Belarus =

The classification of extremist materials in Belarus constitutes a system of legal and administrative measures used by the state to prohibit the distribution of information products. The central mechanism of this system is the Republican List of Extremist Materials (Рэспубліканскі спіс экстрэмісцкіх матэрыялаў), an official registry maintained by the Ministry of Information of Belarus.

While the registry was originally established to counter international terrorism, hate speech, and neo-Nazi propaganda, its application shifted significantly following the 2020 Belarusian presidential election. Since the onset of mass protests, the classification has been extensively used to ban independent media, civil society resources, literary works, and political opposition channels. As of 2025, the list contains over 6,500 entries, covering a significant portion of the Belarusian non-state information space.

== History and legal framework ==
The legal basis for classifying content as extremist is the Law of the Republic of Belarus "On Countering Extremism", enacted on January 4, 2007. The process for banning materials typically involves a district court ruling, often initiated by law enforcement agencies such as the KGB or GUBOPiK. Once a court declares material extremist, the Ministry of Information updates the Republican List to include the specific URL, book title, or visual symbol.

To assess content, the Council of Ministers established the "Republican Expert Commission on Assessing Information for Signs of Extremism" in 2014. The commission is composed of representatives from state academic institutions, the National Academy of Sciences, and security agencies. Human rights advocates have criticized the commission's operations for a lack of transparency, noting that independent experts or the authors of the materials in question are rarely invited to testify during these assessments.

== Scope of prohibited content ==
Prior to 2020, the list grew slowly. However, following the widespread protests against Alexander Lukashenko, the definition of "extremism" was broadened in practice to include criticism of the government, historical narratives challenging state ideology, and satire. The registry now encompasses the entire infrastructure of independent Belarusian journalism and activism.

=== Mass media and digital platforms ===
The majority of independent Belarusian media outlets operating both domestically and in exile have been declared extremist. This ban typically extends to their websites, logos, digital watermarks, and social media accounts. Major designated entities include the country's largest news portal TUT.BY (and its successor Zerkalo.io), the newspapers Nasha Niva, Novy Chas, Charter 97 and international broadcasters such as European Radio for Belarus, Belsat TV, Deutsche Welle (Belarusian service), and the Belarusian service of Radio Free Europe/Radio Liberty. Investigative journalism projects, including Nexta, Belarusian Hajun project and the Belarusian Investigative Center, are also listed.

=== Literature and culture ===
The classification includes printed works, particularly those dealing with Belarusian national history and identity. In a move that drew international attention, authorities banned the novel Dogs of Europe by award-winning author Alhierd Bacharevic. Other notable cultural bans include the Belarusian translation of The Ballad of the Little Tugboat by Nobel laureate Joseph Brodsky, poems by 19th-century classic Wincenty Dunin-Marcinkiewicz, and historical non-fiction by Zmicier Lukashuk which contradicts the official Soviet-centric view of Belarusian statehood.

=== Civil society and scientific communities ===
The list targets various sectors of civic activism, ranging from human rights organizations like Viasna Human Rights Centre and the Belarusian Helsinki Committee to aid funds such as Belarus Solidarity Foundation. The crackdown also encompasses environmental advocacy, notably, the website and social media of the "Green Portal" , the country's oldest specialized ecology media outlet, were designated as extremist. Censorship extends further to specialized scientific communities, for instance, the science blog "LAB-66" by chemist Siarhei Besarab, which focused on radiation safety and chemical threats, was declared extremist material. The "White Coats" community, which united doctors and medical science representatives during 2020 protests, was banned as extremist material in 2022.

=== Public figures and influencers ===
The registry extends beyond organizations to include the personal social media accounts of prominent Belarusian figures. The Ministry of Information systematically lists the Instagram, Telegram, and YouTube pages of political opposition leaders, including those of Sviatlana Tsikhanouskaya and Pavel Latushka, effectively criminalizing their followers.

The scope of censorship also covers cultural and sports figures who expressed support for the 2020 protests:

- Culture: the social media of opera singer Margarita Levchuk and stand-up comedian Slava Komissarenko were declared extremist.
- Sports: the personal accounts of Olympic swimmer Aliaksandra Herasimenia and other athletes from the Belarusian Sport Solidarity Foundation.
- Bloggers: the channels of popular political bloggers and analysts, such as Anton Motolko and Siarhei Tsikhanouski, are banned.

== Legal consequences ==
Violations, such as sharing links to banned pages, reposting content, or possessing banned books, are punishable by fines ranging from 10 to 30 base units for individuals, or administrative detention for up to 15 days. Authorities frequently confiscate the devices (smartphones or computers) used to access the content. Since 2021, the practice of "carousel arrests", where individuals are re-arrested immediately upon release for separate episodes of "distribution", has become common against political dissidents.

== Criticism ==
International human rights organizations, including Amnesty International, the Committee to Protect Journalists (CPJ), and the Belarusian Association of Journalists (BAJ), have condemned the classification system as a tool of political censorship. Critics argue that the law allows for arbitrary application, citing the lack of due process in closed court hearings and the retroactive punishment of citizens for social media posts made years before a specific source was declared extremist.

== See also ==
- Censorship in Belarus
- Human rights in Belarus
- Internet censorship in Belarus
