= Order of the Pahonia =

Order of the Pahonia Ордэн Пагоні
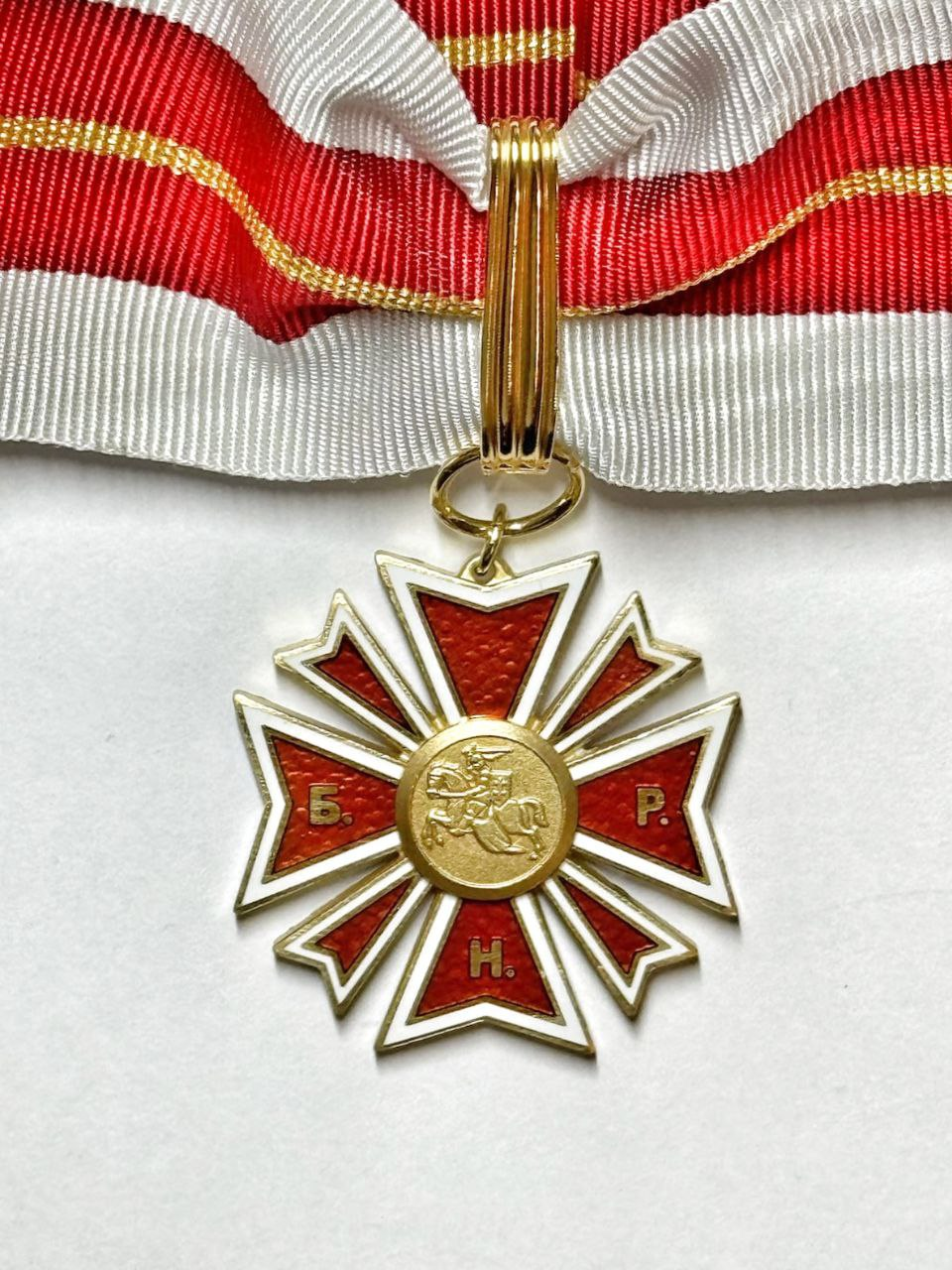
- Commander Cross of the Order of the Pahonia

Awarded by the President of the Rada of the Belarusian Democratic Republic
- Type: Two-grade order
- Established: 1 September 1949
- Country: Belarusian Democratic Republic
- Motto: Не разьбіць, не спыніць, не стрымаць (None can conquer them, stay them or halt, from the poem Pahonia by Maksim Bahdanovich, as translated by Vera Rich)
- Eligibility: All
- Status: Currently awarded
- Grand Master: President of the Rada of the Belarusian Democratic Republic; Ivonka Survilla

Precedence
- Next (higher): none - highest award
- Next (lower): Order of the Iron Knight
- The ribbon bar of the Order (Commandor's cross) The ribbon bar of the Order (Knight's cross) The ribbon bar of the Medal of the Order

Order of the Pahonia (Belarusian: Ордэн Пагоні) is the highest award of the Rada of the Belarusian Democratic Republic, the exiled governmental institution of the Belarusian Democratic Republic.

== History ==
The order was established in 1949 by President Mikola Abramchyk "with the purpose of awarding outstanding civilian or military merits in time of war or peace, made for the glory and benefit of the Belarusian People". According to its statute, the order is "the highest honor of the Belarusian people" and is given to "persons who made a great contribution to the achievement of independence, the reunification of all Belarusian lands, or to the strengthening of the independence and prosperity of the Belarusian state."

The design and concept of the Order of the Pahonia refer to the Order of the White Eagle, established in 1705 in the Polish-Lithuanian Commonwealth and viewed as an object of common heritage of Belarus and Poland.

In 2022, the order's statute was modernised. The Medal of the Order of the Pahonia (Belarusian: Мэдаль Ордэну Пагоні) was established as a decoration by the order. The medal is awarded "to persons who distinguished themselves on the field of struggle for the freedom and independence of Belarus, to outstanding public and cultural figures in Belarus and among Belarusians abroad," and to "foreigners who contributed to research and popularisation of Belarus in the world, as well as contributed to the national interests of Belarus in other ways".

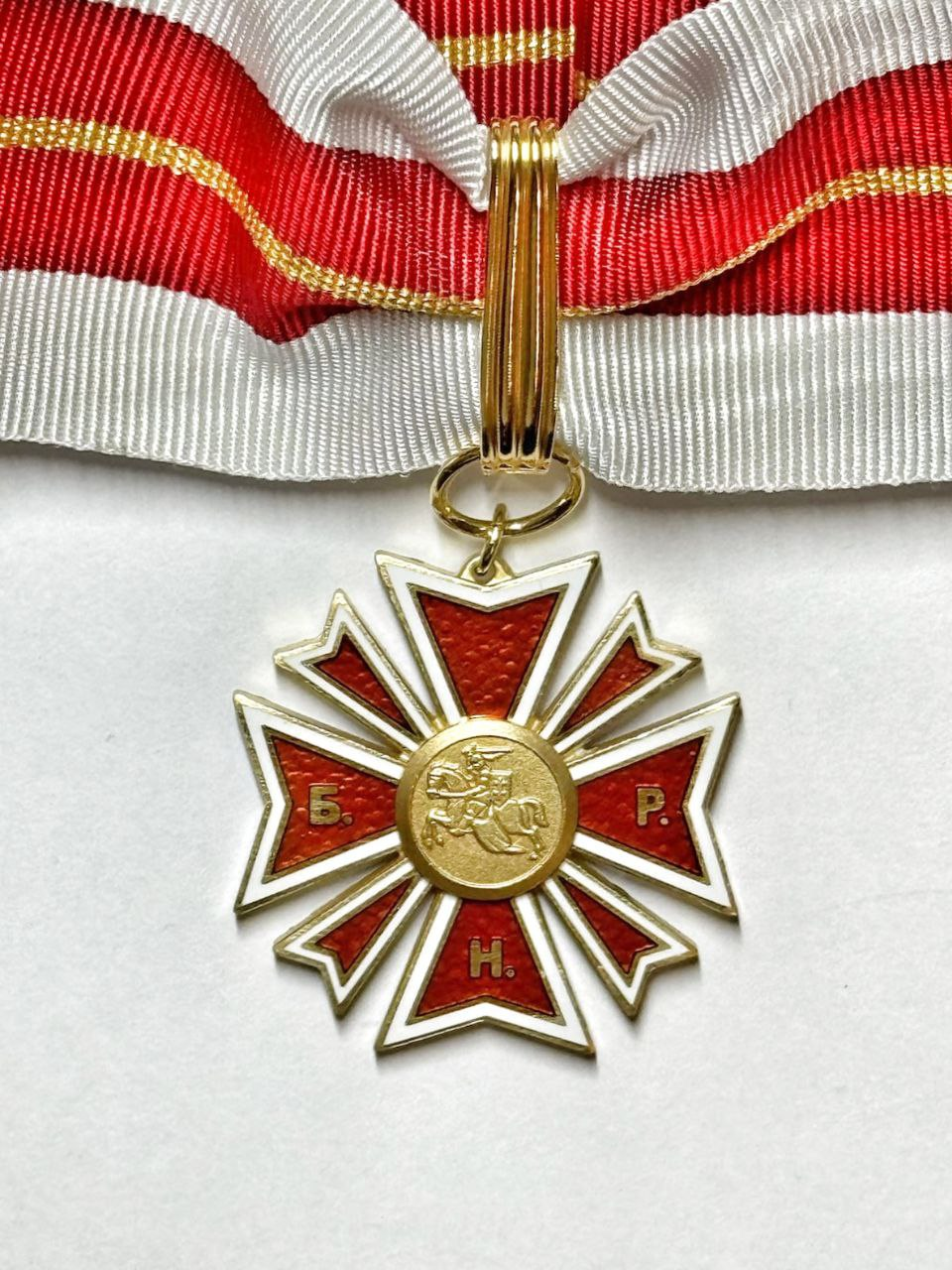
Order of the Pahonia, Commandor's cross

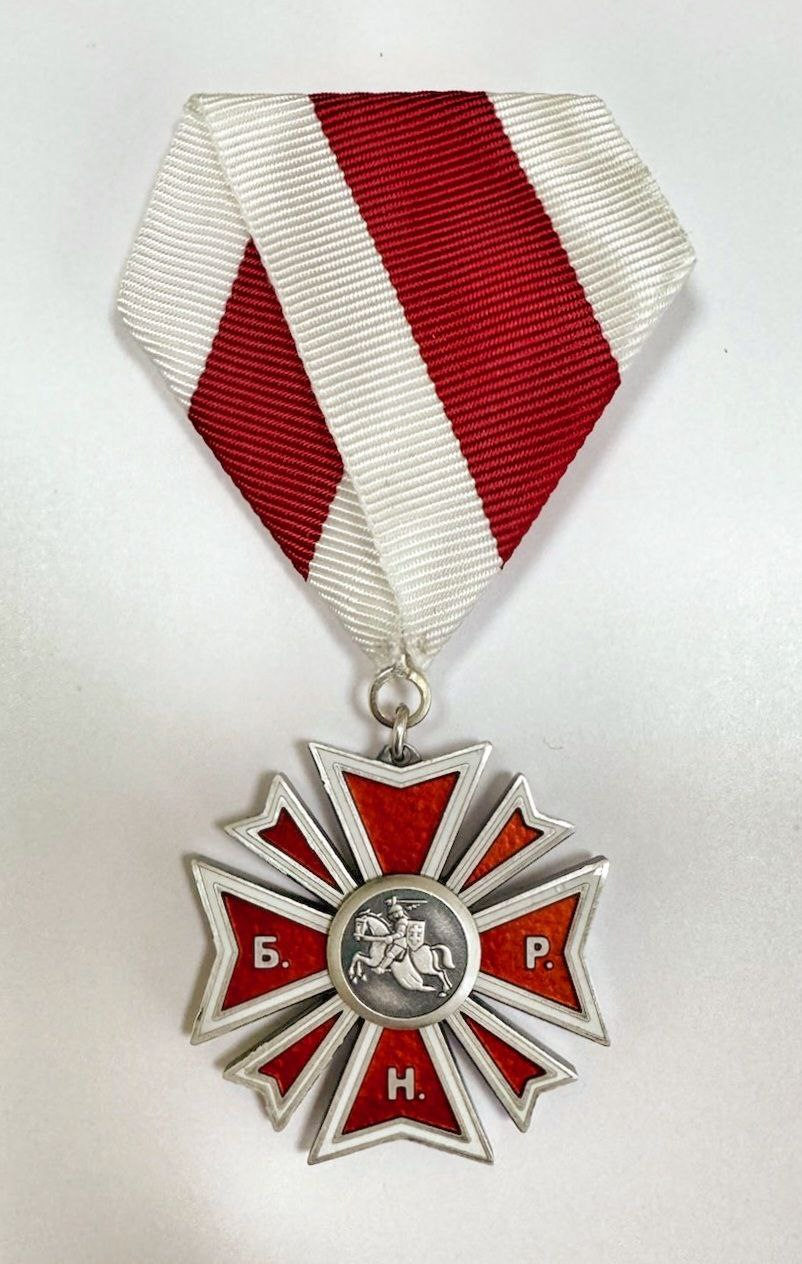
Order of the Pahonia, Knight's cross

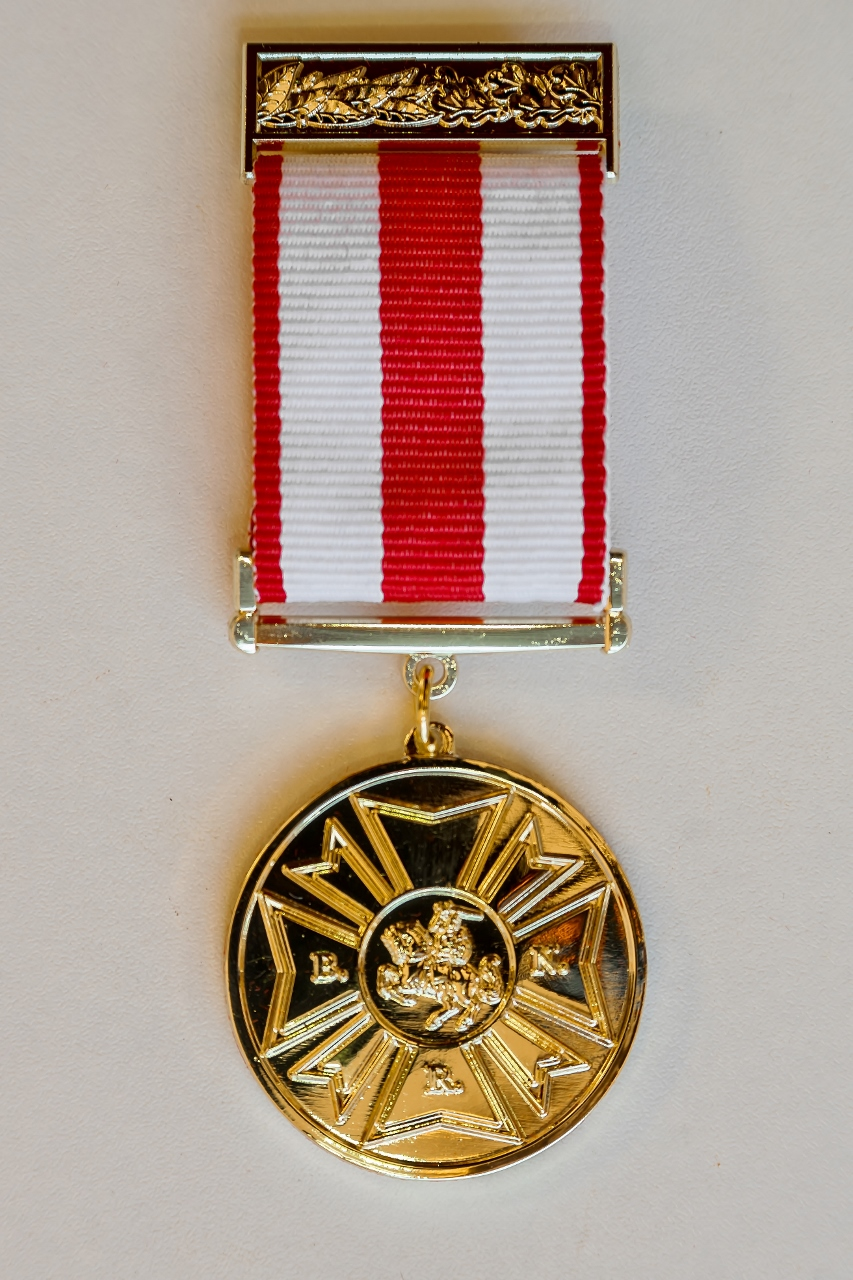
Medal of the Order of the Pahonia

== Awardees ==
=== Order of the Pahonia ===
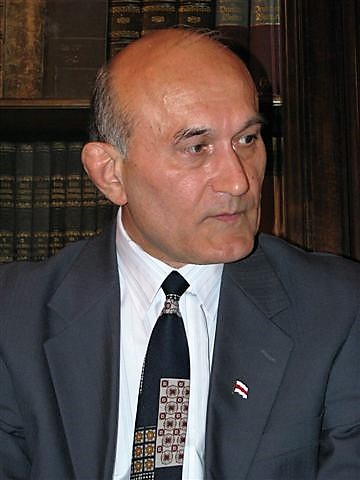
Zianon Pazniak, former leader of the Belarusian Popular Front and one of the first Order of the Pahonia awardees in the 21st century

In 1950, several Belarusian anti-Soviet partisans including Michał Vituška were awarded by decree of President Mikola Abramchyk. No awardings are known to have taken place in the 20th century since then.

On 24 March 2024, the Rada BNR renewed the awardings by granting the title of Member of the Order of the Pahonia to former leader of the Belarusian Popular Front Zianon Pazniak and Nobel Peace Prize winner and political prisoner Ales Bialiatski, as well as to four persons whose names were not disclosed for security reasons.

=== Medal of the Order of the Pahonia ===
Since 2022, President Ivonka Survilla has awarded several Belarusian political prisoners with the Order of the Pahonia Medal. Besides that, several Belarusian volunteer soldiers, who died fighting for Ukraine during the Russo-Ukrainian War as well as protesters killed by the regime of Alyaksandr Lukashenka during the 2020–2021 Belarusian protests were awarded posthumously.

Recipients of the medal include:

- Katsyaryna Andreeva
- Darya Chultsova
- Dzianis Ivashyn
- Ihar Losik
- Aliaksandra Herasimenia
- Alhierd Bacharevič
- Margarita Levchuk
- Vitold Ashurak (posthumously)
- Raman Bandarenka (posthumously)
- Eduard Lobau (posthumously)
- Aliaksiej Skoblia (posthumously)
- Aliaksandr Taraykouski (posthumously)

== See also ==
- Orders, decorations, and medals of Belarus
- Belarusian Democratic Republic 100th Jubilee Medal
- Rada of the Belarusian Democratic Republic
