= Jerzy Giedroyc Literary Award =

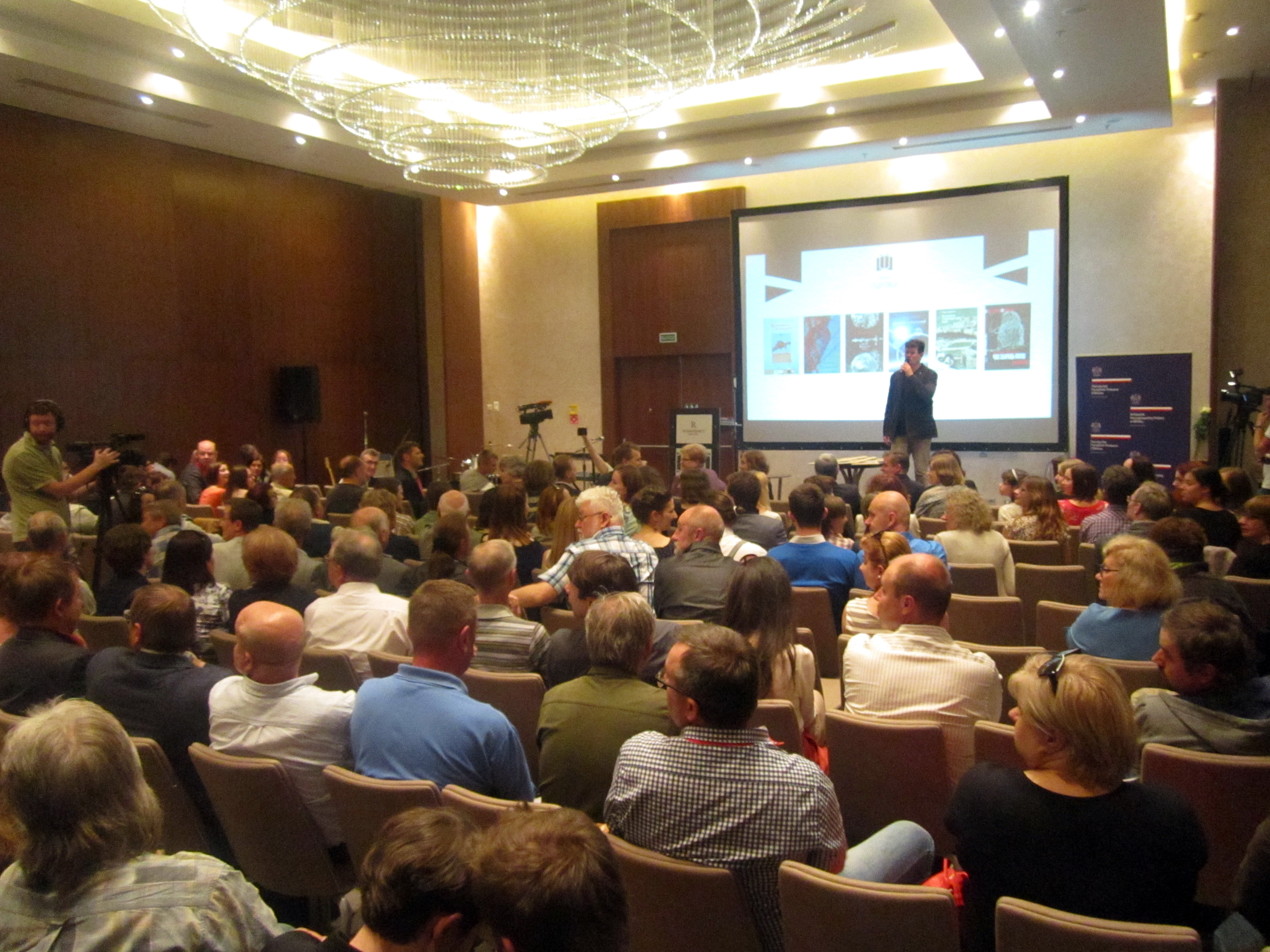
- Jerzy Giedroyc Literary Award in 2015
- Awarded for: Best book of prose written in Belarusian in the preceding year
- Location: Minsk, Belarus
- First award: 2012
- Website: gedroyc.by

Jerzy Giedroyc Literary Award is given for the best book of prose (including non-fiction and collections of essays) written in the Belarusian language. It is co-founded by the Embassy of Poland in Belarus, the Polish Institute in Minsk, the Belarusian PEN Centre, and the Union of Belarusian Writers in memory of the essayist and politician Jerzy Giedroyc.

== Winners ==
- 2012
  - 1st place: Pavel Kastsyukevich: Зборная РБ па негалоўных відах спорту
  - 2nd place: Alhierd Bacharevič: Малая медычная энцыклапедыя Бахарэвіча
  - 3rd place: Andrei Fiedarenka: Мяжа
- 2013
  - 1st place: Uladzimir Nyaklyayew: Аўтамат з газіроўкай з сіропам і без
  - 2nd place: Alhierd Bacharevič: Гамбургскі рахунак Бахарэвіча
  - 3rd place: Adam Hlobus: Сказы
- 2014
  - 1st place: Ihar Babkou: Хвілінка
  - 2nd place: Artur Klinau: Шклатара
  - 3rd place: Vinces' Mudrou: Багун
- 2015
  - 1st place: Viktar Kazko: Час збіраць косці
  - 2nd place: Tatstsiana Barysik: Жанчына і леапард
  - 3rd place: Alhierd Bacharevič: Дзеці Аліндаркі
- 2016
  - 1st place: Maks Ščur: Завяршыць гештальт
  - 2nd place: Alhierd Bacharevič: Белая муха, забойца мужчын
  - 3rd place: Andrei Adamovich: Таўсьціла і лешч
- 2017
  - 1st place: Zmicier Bartosik: Быў у пана верабейка гаварушчы
  - 2nd place: Ludmila Rubleuskaya: Дагератып
  - 3rd place: Adam Hlobus: Зваротная перспектыва
- 2018
  - 1st place: Uładzimir Arłou: Танцы над горадам
  - 2nd place: Alhierd Bacharevič: Сабакі Эўропы
  - 3rd place: Vinces' Mudrou: Забойца анёла
- 2019
  - 1st place: Illia Sin: Libido
  - 2nd place: Mikhail Andrasiuk: Поўня
  - 3rd place: Alena Brava: Садомская яблыня
- 2020
  - 1st place: Siarhiej Dubaviec: Тантамарэскі
  - 2nd place: Andrei Adamovich: Песня пра Цімура
  - 3rd place: Zaraslava Kaminskaya: Калядны стол
- 2021
  - 1st place: Eva Viežnaviec: Па што ідзеш, воўча?
  - 2nd place: Tania Skarynkina: Райцэнтр
  - 3rd place: Siarhiey Ablamieyka: Каліноўскі і палітычнае нараджэньне Беларусі
- 2022
  - 1st place: Siarhiey Ablamieyka: Невядомы Менск: Гісторыя знікнення. Кніга першая
  - 2nd place: Volha Hapeyeva: Самота, што жыла ў пакоі насупраць
  - 3rd place: Valery Hapieyeu: Жэнька, каралева мышак
- 2023
  - 1st place: Hanna Kandratsiuk: У прысценку старога лесу: Гісторыі людзей з Белавежскай пушчы
  - 2nd place: Stsiapan Stureyka: Пасажыры карабля Тэсэя
  - 3rd place: Siarhiey Leskiets: Шэпт
- 2024
  - 1st place: Valiantsin Akudovich: Трэба ўявіць Сізіфа шчаслівым
  - 2nd place: Hanna Yankuta: Час пустазелля
  - 3rd place: Zmitsier Bartosik: Забіць упалмінзага
- 2025
  - 1st place: Siarhiej Dubaviec: Занзібар: Сталенне маладой душы
  - 2nd place: Yuhasia Kalada: Перамена месцаў
  - 3rd place: Zmitsier Dziadzienka: Гульні Цырцэі
