= Kurs =

Kurs or KURS may refer to:

- Kurs, obsolete name for Curonians, one of the extinct Baltic tribes that later formed the Latvian nation
- KURS, a radio station broadcasting at 1040 AM in San Diego, California
- Kurs (docking navigation system), an automatic docking navigation system for the Soyuz-TM spacecraft

== Surname ==
- Svetlana Kurs
- Minni Kurs-Olesk
