= Belarusian Democratic Republic 100th Jubilee Medal =

Belarusian Democratic Republic 100th Jubilee Medal Мэдаль да стагодзьдзя Беларускае Народнае Рэспублікі
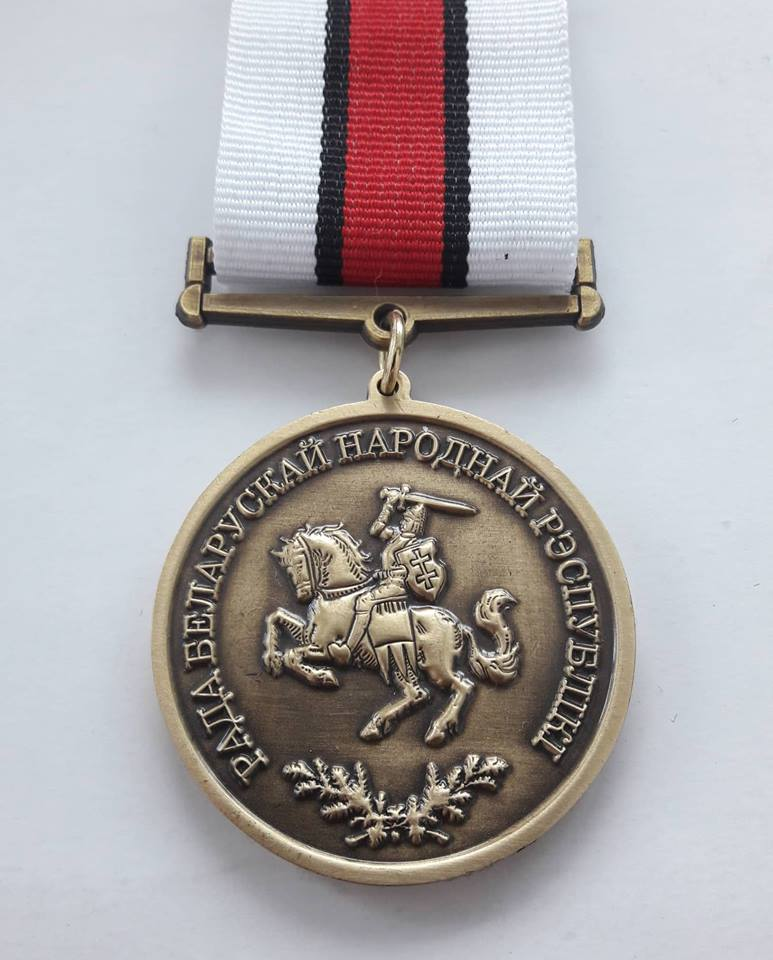
- Abverse of the medal
- Type: Medal
- Awarded for: lifelong achievements in the popularisation and research of Belarus, strengthening of the independence of Belarus, fight for freedom and democracy in Belarus
- Presented by: the Rada of the Belarusian Democratic Republic
- Status: Currently awarded
- Established: 2018

Highlights
- Total: over 180
- Ribbon of the BNR 100th Jubilee Medal

Precedence
- Next (higher): Order of the Pahonia

The Belarusian Democratic Republic 100th Jubilee Medal (Belarusian: Мэдаль да стагодзьдзя Беларускае Народнае Рэспублікі) is a medal awarded in 2018 by the Rada of the Belarusian Democratic Republic (the government in exile of the Belarusian Democratic Republic) to commemorate the 100th anniversary of the establishment of the republic in 1918. The medal has been awarded to more than 180 activists, politicians and researchers in Belarus and abroad.

== Design ==
The obverse features the Pahonia, the symbol of the Belarusian Democratic Republic, and the inscription Рада Беларускай Народнай Рэспублікі (transl. Rada of the Belarusian Democratic Republic). The reverse features the inscription 100 гадоў БНР, 1918-2018 (transl. 100 years of the BNR, 1918-2018) with oak branches and the Cross of Saint Euphrosyne. The ribbon is white with a red stripe separated by thin black lines.

== Recipients ==
Recipients of the medal include:

- Uładzimir Arłou, writer and historian
- Svetlana Alexievich, writer and Nobel Prize laureate
- Bohdan Andrusyshyn, journalist and singer
- Nina Baginskaya, political and human rights activist
- Jim Dingley, translator of Belarusian Literature into English
- Siarhiej Dubaviec, journalist and writer
- Stefan Eriksson, former Swedish ambassador to Belarus
- Michael Kozak, former US Ambassador to Belarus
- George A. Krol, former US Ambassador to Belarus
- Adam Maldzis, historian, literary critic, author and journalist
- Helen Michaluk, activist of the Belarusian community in the United Kingdom
- Zianon Pazniak, politician, one of the founders of the Belarusian Popular Front and nominee for President of Belarus in the 1994 election
- Ales Pushkin, artist
- Natalya Radina, journalist
- Piatro Sadoŭski, first ambassador of the Republic of Belarus to Germany
- Stanislau Shushkevich, first post-Soviet head of state of independent Belarus
- Daniel V. Speckhard, former US Ambassador to Belarus
- Jury Turonak, historian and activist of the Belarusian minority in Poland
- Dr. Jan Zaprudnik, historian and activist of the Belarusian community in the United States
- Sergei Antonchik, Belarusian politician, labor activist, and trade unionist
