= Belarusian Hajun project =

- Беларускі Гаюн
- Logo of the organization
- Founder: Anton Motolko
- Type: Nonprofit
- Official language: English, Russian
- Website: hajun.info

Belarusian Hajun (Note: English: /hɑːˈjuːn/) (Belarusian: Беларускі Гаюн (Note: Belarusian pronunciation: [bʲeɫaˈruskʲi ɣaˈjun])) was an OSINT project, monitoring military activity of Russian and Belarusian troops on the territory of Belarus. The monitoring group was created before the start of the 2022 full-scale Russian invasion of Ukraine by activist Anton Motolko. The project was named after the Belarusian mythical character, forest spirit Hajun. The Lithuanian National Radio and Television stated that the information published by the monitoring project was frequently referenced by major Ukrainian media outlets, helping Ukrainian civilians and military to better understand threats posed by Russian troops deployed on the territory of Belarus.

After the personal data of people who sent information to the project's Telegram chatbot fell into the hands of the Belarusian authorities, the largest repressive campaign in Belarus was launched, second only to the persecution of people in connection with the 2020 protests. By February 2026, human rights activists were aware of 163 people detained due to sending information to Hajun, and the total number of detainees could be around 1,500. Detained people are being sentenced to restrictions of freedom or imprisonment.

== History ==
Belarusian Hajun was created in early January 2022 as a monitoring initiative to track movements of Russian military equipment and troops on the territory of Belarus. The project had the task of monitoring the amount of equipment transported into the country and withdrawn, and where a new Russian military base could potentially emerge. The project was created so that Belarusians would understand what was happening on the territory of Belarus. On February 20, 2022, the Telegram channel of Hajun was created, in which the team began publishing information about detected Russian troops and their movements. For the first two months of the war, the team had to work 24/7. In February and March, an average of 1500 people a day wrote to the project. At the peak, this figure reached up to 2000 people. In March 2022, the Ministry of Internal Affairs of Belarus recognized the project's Telegram channel as an extremist formation. In April 2022, more than 360 thousand people subscribed to the channel. At that time, 90% were subscribers from Ukraine, and the rest were Belarusians. As of February 25, 2023, more than half a million people were subscribed to the project's Telegram channel.

== Operating principle ==
The main source of information is the subscribers of the Telegram channel. They send messages to a special chatbot. As of April 11, 2022, more than 33 thousand messages from 10 thousand people were sent to the bot. Also, part of the information is received from social networks such as Vkontakte and Odnoklassniki. 90% of the information received from social networks at the time of the beginning of the war was from TikTok. In addition, messengers and publications of various media outlets are monitored. The information is structured and conclusions are drawn based on it.

The project has developed a system of fact-checking and verification, but it is not disclosed so that it is harder for third parties to suggest publishing disinformation. Sometimes, when the team was not completely sure of the veracity of information, they published it with a note «not verified.»

=== Team ===
Details about the team are kept secret. As of April 11, 2022, the majority of the team worked outside Belarus. Most of them are residents of Belarus who had to flee the country due to criminal prosecution. By February 25, 2023, the team's composition almost didn't change.

== Reaction of the Belarusian government ==
On March 16, 2022, the Ministry of Internal Affairs of Belarus recognized the Telegram channel and chat of Belarusian Hajun as an extremist group. A record that Hajun performs extremist activities appeared in the list of extremist organizations and formations on the ministry's website.

In December 2022, Belarusian security services under the guise of observers of Belarusian Hajun tried to find out personal data and create dossiers on the project's subscribers. They did it with the help of dating chatbots. In the messages, they asked to provide full name, date of birth and place of residence, as well as other personal data.

As of September 8, 2023, the project's founder was aware of 10 arrests for interacting with Belarusian Hajun. Anton Motolko said that some people were identified through street video surveillance, and some after finding a Telegram bot in their phones.

In April 2023, Belarusian state TV showed a story about the arrest of IT specialist Dmitry Mastavy. The authors of the movie accused him of organizing a live streaming at Machulishchy airfield. They claimed that Hajun's chatbot was controlled by Belarusian law enforcement agencies. The Zerkalo media outlet noted that there was no evidence of these claims on the air of state TV, and the authors used computer graphics instead of screenshots of the messages. The administration of Hajun stated that the detained programmer didn't organize live streaming for them, and that the claims about the control of their chatbot by law enforcement agencies are «nonsense.

=== Security forces infiltration and termination of the project ===
On February 5, 2025, Anton Motolko reported that as a result of unauthorized entry, Belarusian security forces gained access to a chat with the "Hajun" bot earlier that morning, where information from people was collected. The security forces gained access to the chat by clicking on an invitation link that was created on March 2, 2022. At the time of the security forces' infiltration of the chat, the function of hiding old messages for new users was not enabled in its settings. The scale of the data uploaded is unknown. The head of the Belarus Solidarity Foundation, Andrei Stryzhak, stated that due to the security forces' access to information from the "Belarusian Hajun" chatbot, 50 requests for emergency evacuation from Belarus were received on their hotline in just 24 hours. On February 7, 2025, the monitoring project "Belarusian Hajun" announced the termination of its activities.

=== Mass repressions against informants ===
By February 2026, human rights activists were aware of 163 detained Hajun informants, and the total number of detainees could be around 1,500. Human rights activists compare the arrests, investigation, and trial to an assembly line. Investigative actions are almost not carried out, the evidence in the case usually consists only of the fact that "Hajun" was declared an extremist formation, the fact of sending information to Motolko's chatbot with Telegram account IDs, and information from databases that links IDs with phone numbers. Detainees are charged under article 361^{4} (article 361, note 4) of the Criminal Code of Belarus ("Assisting extremist activities") that can be punished up to 7 years of prison.

=== International reaction ===
In a statement dated October 14, 2025, the Ministry of Foreign Affairs of Ukraine called on the international community to increase pressure on Alexander Lukashenko's regime in connection with the mass arrests due to the "Hajun case". The Ukrainian Foreign Ministry links this case to an attempt to replenish the pool of political prisoners for exchange purposes.
