= Dzianis Ivashyn =

Belarusian journalist (born 1979)

- Дзяніс Івашын
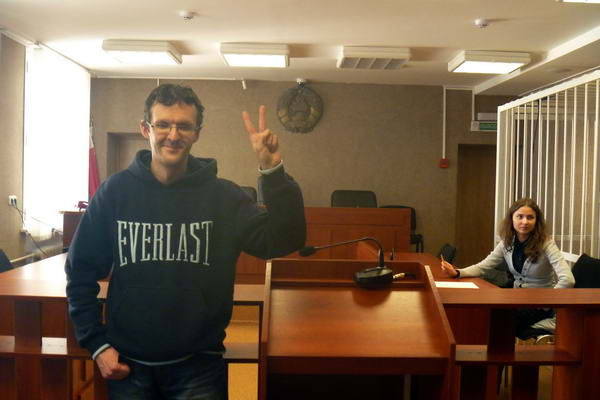
- Dzianis Ivašyn, Belarusian journalist in court in 2017
- Born: 6 June 1979; Hrodna, Belarusian SSR, USSR
- Occupation: Journalist
- Awards: Medal of the Order of the Pahonia

Dzianis Jaŭhienavič Ivashyn (also Dzyanis Ivashyn, Denis Ivashin; Belarusian: Дзяніс Яўгенавіч Івашын; Russian: Денис Евгеньевич Ивашин; born 6 June 1979, Hrodna, USSR) is a Belarusian journalist. He works as a freelance correspondent for the Novy Chas newspaper and a volunteer investigator of the Ukrainian InformNapalm project. He was arrested in 2021 by the Belarusian KGB and charged with high treason. His colleagues believe that the arrest was connected with his publications about former Ukrainian Berkut members employed by the Belarusian police.

== Journalist ==
Ivashyn participated in the 2014 Euromaidan in Ukraine, and later that year he joined the Ukrainian investigative project InformNapalm as an editor of its Belarusian edition. In 2018, he became a freelance correspondent of the Novy Chas newspaper. His main publications were dedicated to the foreign influence of Russia in Belarus and Syria, commercial development near the Kurapaty mass grave of the 1930s' Great Purge in the Soviet Union, and employment of former Ukrainian Berkut members by the Belarusian police. In 2017, he was sentenced to 5 days of prison for carrying out journalism at the Freedom Day meeting.

On 12 March 2021, Ivashyn was detained in Hrodna by the Belarusian KGB. His detention happened soon after he published an article about Berkut members in OMON, the Belarusian riot police. According to Ivashyn, who claimed to use only open source material, more than 10 former Berkut members who had left Ukraine served in Belarusian OMON as soldiers, ensigns and officers. He claimed that granting Belarusian citizenship to them and recruitment to police involved legal violations, and stated that several former Berkut members participated in the suppression of the 2020 Belarusian protests.

Originally, Ivashyn was charged under article 365 of the Belarusian Criminal Code ("Interference in the activities of a police officer"). On 30 October 2021, it was revealed that he was also charged under article 356 ("High treason"). His lawyer signed a nondisclosure agreement preventing him from disclosing information about the inquiry. Ivashyn was placed in the punishment cell (Russian: карцер) at least 5 times (30 days). According to his wife, he had a stroke during his second stay in the punishment cell. His relatives claim that his right to correspond was artificially restricted by the prison manager.

On 24 March 2021, eight Belarusian human rights organizations recognized Ivashyn as a political prisoner and called for his immediate release. The European Federation of Journalists also demanded his immediate release. Seán Haughey, Irish member of Parliament, became a "godfather" (sponsor) of Ivashyn.

In March 2023, he was awarded the Medal of the Order of the Pahonia.
