= Eduard Lobau =

Belarusian pro-democracy activist (1988–2023)

- Эдуард Лобаў
- Born: 1 December 1988; Vilnius, Lithuanian SSR, USSR
- Died: 26 January 2023 (aged 34); Vuhledar, Ukraine
- Occupation: Democracy activist
- Organization: Young Front
- Known for: 2010 arrest
- Awards: Medal of the Order of the Pahonia Order for Courage, 3rd Class

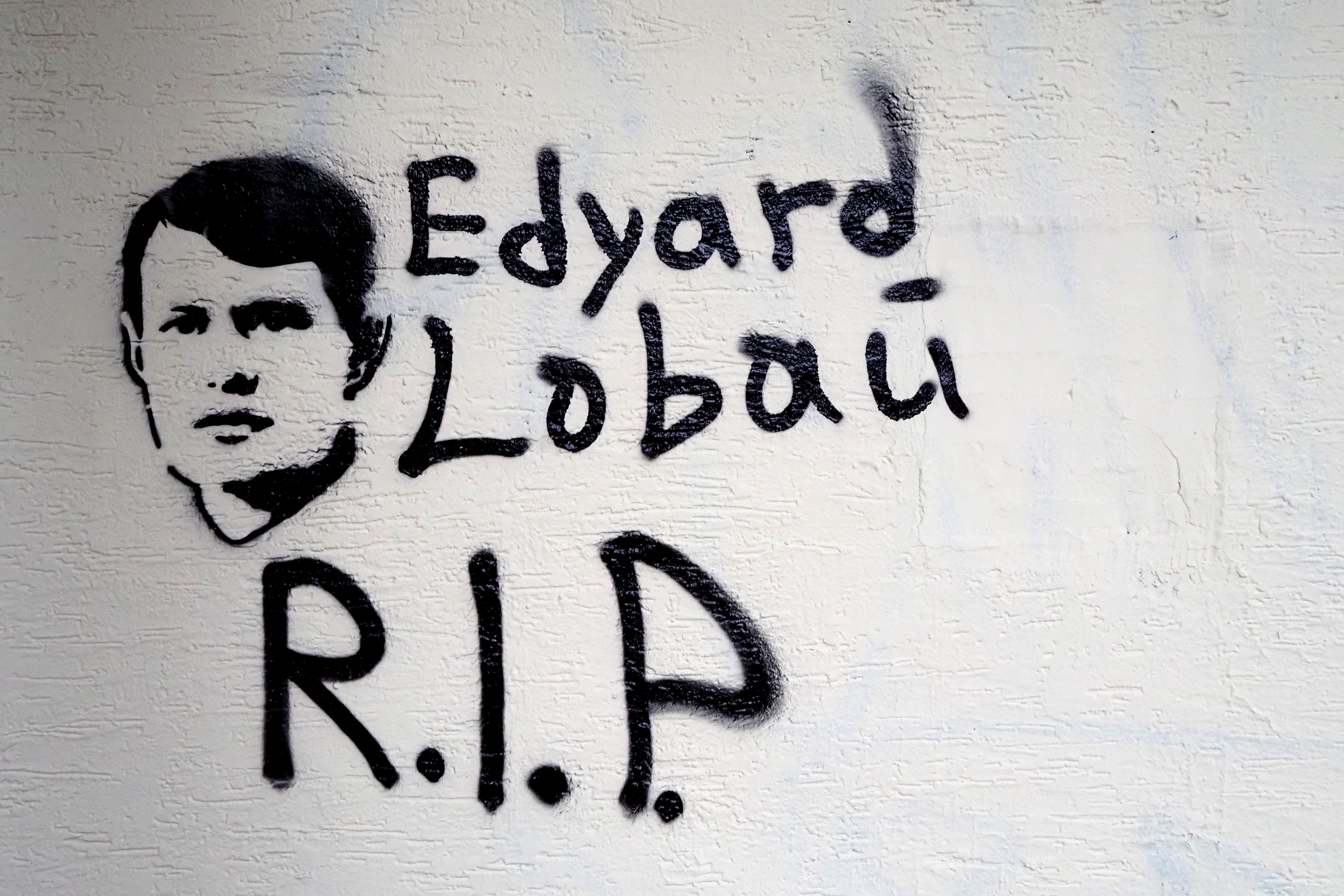

Eduard Anatolievič Lobaŭ (Belarusian: Эдуард Анатолевіч Лобаў; 1 December 1988 – 26 January 2023) was a Belarusian activist associated with the Young Front. He was imprisoned by the government of Belarus for his protest activities. Amnesty International considered him a prisoner of conscience.

== Activism ==
On 19 December 2010, following Belarus's disputed presidential election—in which pro-democracy opposition candidate Andrei Sannikov lost to Lukashenko, often called "Europe's last dictator"—a number of opposition protesters took to the streets.

In the week leading up to the protest, Lobau took an active role in organization. On 15 December, he was arrested and briefly detained along with two other Young Front activists for picketing Lukoshenko's office in Minsk with signs calling for his resignation. According to Amnesty International, the day before the protests, Lobau was reportedly assaulted by unknown attackers and immediately arrested by police, along with Zmitser Dashkevich, Young Front's leader. He was convicted of attacking his assailants and sentenced to four years in a labour colony in Ivatsevichy. On 31 August 2011, he refused to file a pardon application.

=== Imprisonment ===
Lobau's imprisonment has been protested by human rights organizations including Amnesty International, which named he and Dashkevich prisoners of conscience and called for their immediate release. His case was also "adopted" by German Bundestag member Florian Toncar, deputy chairman of Germany's Free Democratic Party, who denounced his trial and imprisonment as "Stalinist". On 18 December 2014, Lobau was released from prison.

== War in Ukraine ==
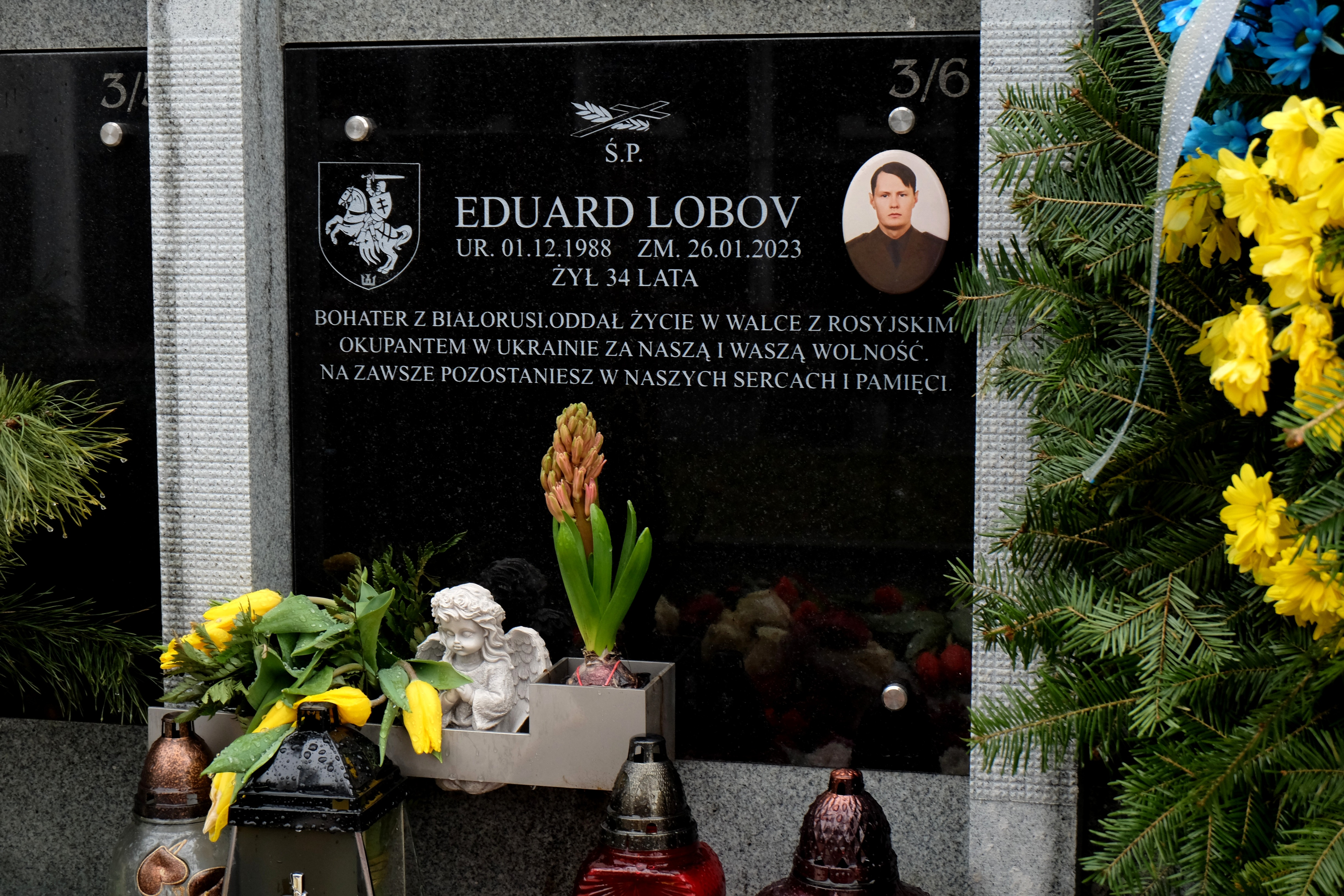

Since the summer of 2015, Lobau has been fighting as a volunteer in the war in Donbas. He served in one of the Ukrainian units near Mariupol.

== Death ==
On 26 January 2023, Lobau was killed in action near Vuhledar, during the Russian invasion of Ukraine. He was 34.

Lobau was buried at the Powązki Military Cemetery in Warsaw.

== Awards ==
On March 25, 2023, Lobau was posthumously awarded the medal of the Order of the Pahonia by the Rada of the Belarusian Democratic Republic. President of Ukraine Volodymyr Zelenskyy posthumously awarded Eduard Lobov with the Order for Courage of the III degree.
