= Nina Bahinskaya =

Belarusian opposition activist

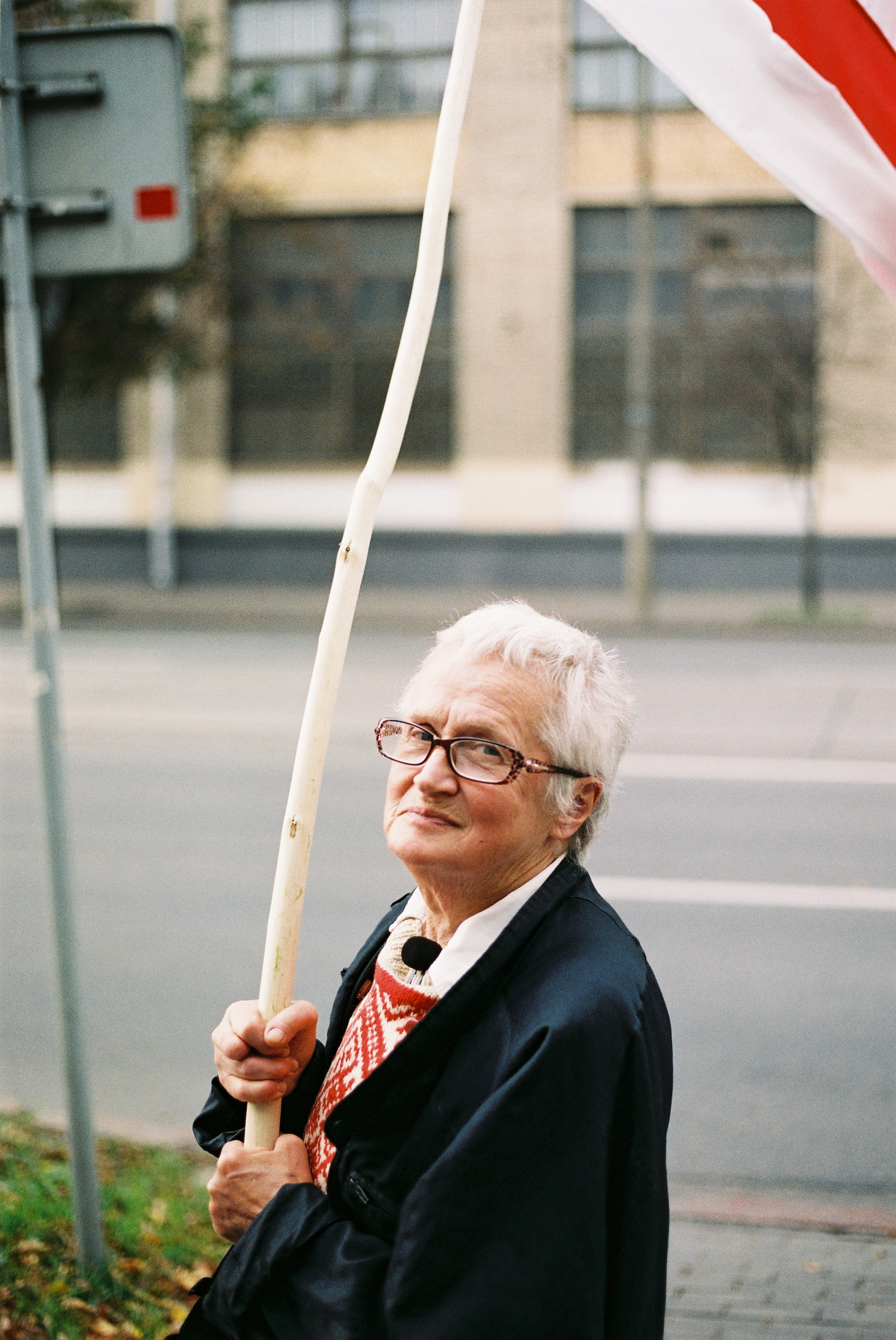
- “Nina Bahinskaya on her ordinary Sunday walk with the flag“
- Born: 30 December 1946 (age 79); Minsk, Byelorussian SSR, Soviet Union (now Belarus)
- Citizenship: Belarusian
- Education: Belarusian State University of Informatics and Radioelectronics
- Occupation: Geologist

Nina Bahinskaya (Belarusian: Ніна Рыгораўна Багінская, romanized: Nina Ryhoraŭna Bahinskaja, born 30 December 1946, Minsk, Belarus) is a Belarusian human rights activist, public figure, and geologist.

== Biography ==
Nina Bahginskaya was born in Minsk, Belarus, on 30 December 1946. From an early age, she was a competitive cyclist. In her younger years, while on a bike ride, she was involved in an accident that led to a collision with a car, which resulted in a head injury and post-traumatic epilepsy.

Bahinskaya graduated from the Belarusian State University of Informatics and Radioelectronics, specializing in radio equipment assembly. Following her childhood dream of becoming a geologist, she graduated from the Ivano-Frankivsk Institute of Oil and Gas (Ukraine) as a specialist in oil and gas exploration. She worked as a geologist at the Belarusian Research Geological Institute (BelNIGRI). At the same time, she became a member of the Belarusian Popular Front and created a local association of the Belarusian Popular Front at her institute.

Since 1988, starting with the requiem meeting on the Day of Remembrance of the Ancestors, she has been actively participating in various protests. In 1994, after A.G. Lukashenko came to power in Belarus, she was dismissed from the institute because her project's report was prepared in the Belarusian language.

She was detained dozens of times by police and spent many days in temporary isolation cells. On 1 August 2014 she was arrested for burning the Soviet flag near the KGB building in Minsk; her demonstration commemorated the burning, on 1 August 1937, of tens of thousands of Belarusian cultural manuscripts, after which the authors of the work were executed.

In 2015, Bahinskaya was arrested for protesting in memory of Mikhail Zhiznevsky, who died at the Euromaidan in Ukraine. After the events of 25 March 2017, when dozens of activists were arrested in Minsk (the “White Legion” case), and hundreds of participants throughout Belarus were detained on Freedom Day, Nina Bahinskaya went out to the KGB building every day with a white-red-white flag and a poster that read "Freedom to the People."

On 5 April 2019 she took part in another protest. The point of this protest was to obstruct the so-called “landscaping work”, which on 4 April 2019 demolished 30 memorial crosses along the perimeter of the mass graves of those shot in the 1930s. Pavel Sevyarynets, a politician and co-chairman of Belarusian Christian Democracy, and Nina Bahinskaya, who came with a large white-red-white flag, were detained.

In 2020, Bahinskaya supported protests after the presidential elections on August 9. Because of her bravery, she became a symbol of the movement. She gave interviews to BBC News as well as journalists from Sweden, Poland, Germany, France. Maxim Katz dedicated one of the episodes to Bhginskaya on his Youtube channel.

In 2020, Bahinskaya became famous for her expression “I am just walking” after replying this to the riot police who attempted to stop her and take away her flag.

In September 2020, Baginskaya was featured in the Italian Vogue magazine as The mother of the Belarusian revolution; she was photographed by Ivan Revyako.

All the White-red-white flags that Bhginskaya uses in the protests are sewn by her. Bahinskaya does not use the flags that people try to gift her. She also sews the flags for others. The largest flag she made was a 9-meter flag (9m x 4.5m); it took her three days to sew it, and she gave it away to the youth.

The cumulative fines that Bhginskaya owes to the government for her participation in hundreds of protests account for tens of thousands of dollars. Her summer property is auctioned for sale by the state. The government takes 50% of Bahinskaya's pension (in 2020, her pension was 200 Belarusian rubles ($77 US) per month).

== Awards ==
- 2017 - awarded with the Ivashkevich commemorative plaque.
- 2018 - the first laureate of the medal named after Sergei Khanzhenkov (1942-2016), a political prisoner of the Soviet regime in the 1960s and 1970s.
- 2018 - Belarusian Democratic Republic 100th Jubilee Medal
- 2020 - "People of Freedom" award from Radio Freedom.

== See also ==
- 2017 Belarusian protests
- 2020 Belarusian protests
- White-red-white flag
- Freedom Day (Belarus)
- Soviet dissidents
- Kurapaty
- Soviet repressions in Belarus
- Maria Kalesnikava

== Bibliography ==
- Meet the 73-Year-Old Great-Grandmother Defying the Dictatorship in Belarus
- Who is Nina Baginskaya, the 73-year-old Belarusian protester that takes on riot police?
- Belarus' 73-Year-Old Protest Icon Among Hundreds of Women Detained in Minsk
- Belarus protests: Opposition icon, 73, among hundreds detained in Minsk
- Lukashenko orders “no arrest” for Belarusian revolutionary pensioner Nina Baginskaya
- Эвика Отто. Нина Багинская: «Чтобы уплатить все штрафы за участие в митингах, мне нужно прожить минимум 120 лет» // Комсомольская правда. 9 сентября 2020.
- Лецішча 69-гадовай Ніны Багінскай выстаўлена на аўкцыён | Дача Нины Багинской выставлена на аукцион // Радыё Свабода. 9 августа 2016.
- Штодня да будынка КДБ з пікетам выходзіць Ніна Багінская | Ежедневный пикет Нины Богинской // Радыё Свабода. 8 апреля 2017.
- Ніна Багінская ў відэа да 10-годдзя "Белсату" // БЕЛСАТ NEWS. 10 ноября 2017.
- Нина Багинская: «Что вы собираетесь найти в моих колготках?» // Вясна. 11.04.2019.
- Валерия Уласик, Елена Шалаева. «Вышла, подняла флаг и стоит». Пенсионерка из Беларуси должна государству 16 тысяч долларов за акции протеста // Настоящее Время. 19 июня 2019.
- «Пошла домой шить новый флаг. И точить новое древко»: История Нины Багинской — «белорусской бабушки, которая просто гуляет», — рассказанная ей самой // Холод. 21.08.2020.
- Нина Багинская: «Белорусы не простят Лукашенко» // DW на русском. 30 августа 2020.
- Кто такая Нина Багинская, ставшая символом протестов в Беларуси? // BBC News - Русская служба. 4 сентября 2020.
- Ніна Багінская — гісторыя нязломнай жанчыны / Нина Багинская / Ток // NN VIDEO TV. 10 сентября 2020.
- Интервью с легендой белорусского протеста Ниной Багинской // Здесь и сейчас // Телеканал Дождь. 20 сентября 2020.
- Нина Багинская «я гуляю!» и БЧБ (бело-красно-белый) флаг. Символы революции в Беларуси / Максим Кац
- // БЕЛСАТ LIFE. 12 октября 2020.
- // Телеканал Дождь. 22 октября 2020.
- Italian Vogue Publishes Photos Of Icon Protester Nina Baginskaya // BelarusFeed. 30 September 2020.
