= Siarhiej Dubaviec =

Belarusian journalist and writer (born 1959)

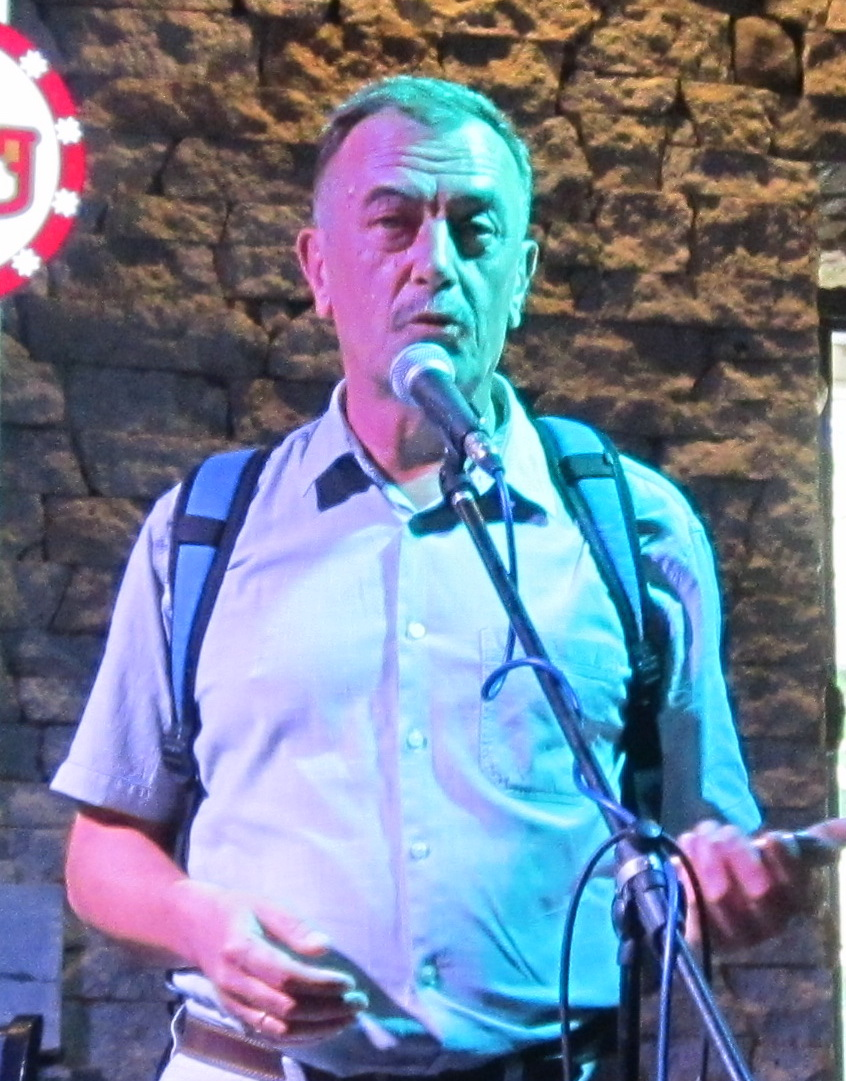
Siarhiej Dubaviec

Siarhiej Dubaviec (Belarusian: Сяргей Дубавец, pronounced [sʲarˈɣʲɛj dubaˈvʲɛt͡s]; born September 17, 1959, in Mazyr) is a Belarusian journalist and writer.

Graduated from the Belarusian State University journalism faculty.

Worked for the Belarusian Soviet Encyclopedia publishing house, the newspaper Homielskaja Praŭda and illegal anti-Soviet newspapers.

Editor of literature critics department in Nioman magazine (1987–1990), chief editor of the newspapers Svaboda (1990) (1990–1991) and "Naša Niva" (1991–2000), the radio "Bałtyjskija Chvali" (2000–2001), author of the programme "Vostraja Brama" on the Radio Liberty Belarusian edition (since 1997).

Resides currently in Vilnius.

== Books ==
- "Praktykavańni" (Practices, 1991),
- "Русская книга" (The Russian book, 1997),
- "Dziońnik pryvatnaha čałavieka" (A private person's diary, 1998).
- "Jak?" (How?, 2009)

== Awards ==
- Belarusian Democratic Republic 100th Jubilee Medal by the Rada of the Belarusian Democratic Republic.
- Jerzy Giedroyc Literary Award
  - 2020: 1st place for Тантамарэскі, Tantamareski, 'Tintamareski (photo stand-ins)'
  - 2025: 1st place for Занзібар: Сталенне маладой душы, Zanzibar: Stalenneje maladoj dushy, for his "philosophical reflection on the search for national identity for his generation"
