= Ihar Losik =

Belarusian blogger and journalist

- Born: 20 May 1992 (age 33); Baranavichy, Belarus
- Known for: Blogging
- Awards: Medal of the Order of the Pahonia

Ihar Alyaksandravich Losik (Belarusian: Ігар Аляксандравіч Лосік, Russian: Игорь Александрович Лосик, born 20 May 1992) is a Belarusian blogger and consultant of the Belarusian section of Radio Free Europe/Radio Liberty. From 2020 to 2025 he was held in prison by Belarusian authorities. Viasna Human Rights Centre and Amnesty International recognized him as a political prisoner.

== Life ==
Losik graduated from Baranavichy State University in 2015. By specialty he is a philologist, a teacher of a foreign language. However, he did not work by profession. In 2015-2016 he received the Vaclav Havel scholarship. Since 2018, he is the father of a daughter, named Paulina.

In 2011, Losik became an administrator of the Revolution through Social Networks movement. It was him who had the idea of peaceful, silent protests. After the first successful protests, State Security Committee of the Republic of Belarus officers became interested in him. Losik has ceased his participation in the administration of this protest movement.

Since February 2013, he has been running a Twitter account with the name "RB [Republic of Belarus] of the Brain". Since October 2014, as a social media specialist, he has published articles on Radio Free Europe/Radio Liberty. From May 15, 2016, he began to conduct a channel with the name of "RB [Republic of Belarus] of the Brain" on Telegram.

=== Arrest in 2020 ===
On June 25, 2020, in a house in Baranavichy, after an hour-long search, law enforcement agencies detained Ihar Losik. During the search, a laptop, a computer and a telephone were seized. In the evening of the same day, it became known that a criminal case was opened against the blogger under Article 342 of the Criminal Code of the Republic of Belarus (Organization and preparation of actions that grossly violate public order, or active participation in them). On 9 July 2021, godparenthood for the political prisoner was taken by Manuel Sarrazin, Member of the German Bundestag.

On December 15, 2020, Losik announced to start a hunger strike which lasted until January 21, 2021. He explained this decision by expressing that he was amazed by a wave of solidarity and pleas of hundreds and hundreds of Belarusians to stop. In March 2021, a new charge was brought against Losik. When he was informed of the new accusation, he attempted to cut his hands in front of the investigator and the lawyer. He also announced to go on a ‘dry’ hunger strike.

On December 14, 2021, Losik was charged under "organization of mass riots" and "incitement to social hatred" and sentenced to 15 years in a maximum security prison in Gomel. Along with him, Mikola Statkevich, Sergei Tikhanovsky and three other political prisoners were also sentenced.

In March 2023, he was awarded the Medal of the Order of the Pahonia.

=== Release ===
Losik was released from prison and deported to Lithuania on September 11, 2025, following a meeting between John Coale, representing US President Donald Trump, and Belarusian dictator Alexander Lukashenko.
