= Jim Dingley =

- Born: 24 March 1942 (age 84); Leeds, UK
- Citizenship: United Kingdom
- Education: University of Cambridge
- Occupations: historian, researcher, translator of Belarusian literature
- Employer(s): British Museum, University of Reading, University of London

Jim Dingley (born 24 March 1942) is a researcher and promoter of Belarusian culture in the UK as well as a translator of Belarusian literature.

== Early life ==
Dingley was born in Leeds on 24 March 1942. After studies of Russian and other Slavonic languages at the University of Cambridge, he became a lecturer at the University of Reading and then the University of London.

== Researcher and promoter of Belarusian culture ==
Dingley became involved with Belarusian studies in 1965, after meeting Fr Alexander Nadson. He gave regular lectures at the Anglo-Belarusian Society and contributed a number of articles to The Journal of Belarusian Studies.

He chaired the Anglo-Belarusian Society for several decades and was one of the original trustees of the Francis Skaryna Belarusian Library, serving in that capacity for nearly 40 years.

== Translator of Belarusian literature ==
Dingley translated into English a number of Belarusian works, including:

- “Letter to a Russian Friend: a 'samizdat' Publication from Soviet Byelorussia” (“Письмо русскому другу ”) by Aliaksiej Kaŭka;
- “This Country Called Belarus” (“Краінa Беларусь”) by Uładzimir Arłou;
- “Down Among the Fishes” (“Рыбін горад”) by Natalka Babina;
- “A Large Czeslaw Milosz With a Dash of Elvis Presley” (“Шмат Чэслава Мілаша, крыху Элвіса Прэслі”) by Tania Skarynkina;
- "Alindarka's Children: Things Will Be Bad" (“Дзеці Аліндаркі”) by Alhierd Bacharevič.

In an interview in 2020, he mentioned that “the difficulties arise when there are specifically Belarusian aspects of the text that may need to be explained to Anglophone readers”.

== Awards ==
Dingley was awarded a Francis Skaryna Medal in 1991 and a Belarusian Democratic Republic 100th Jubilee Medal in 2019 for his significant contribution to Belarusian studies.

In January 2023, Dingley received a PEN Translates award for his translation of Zekameron by Maxim Znak
