= Bohdan Andrusyshyn =

Belarusian journalist and singer (born 1958)

- Багдан Андрусішын
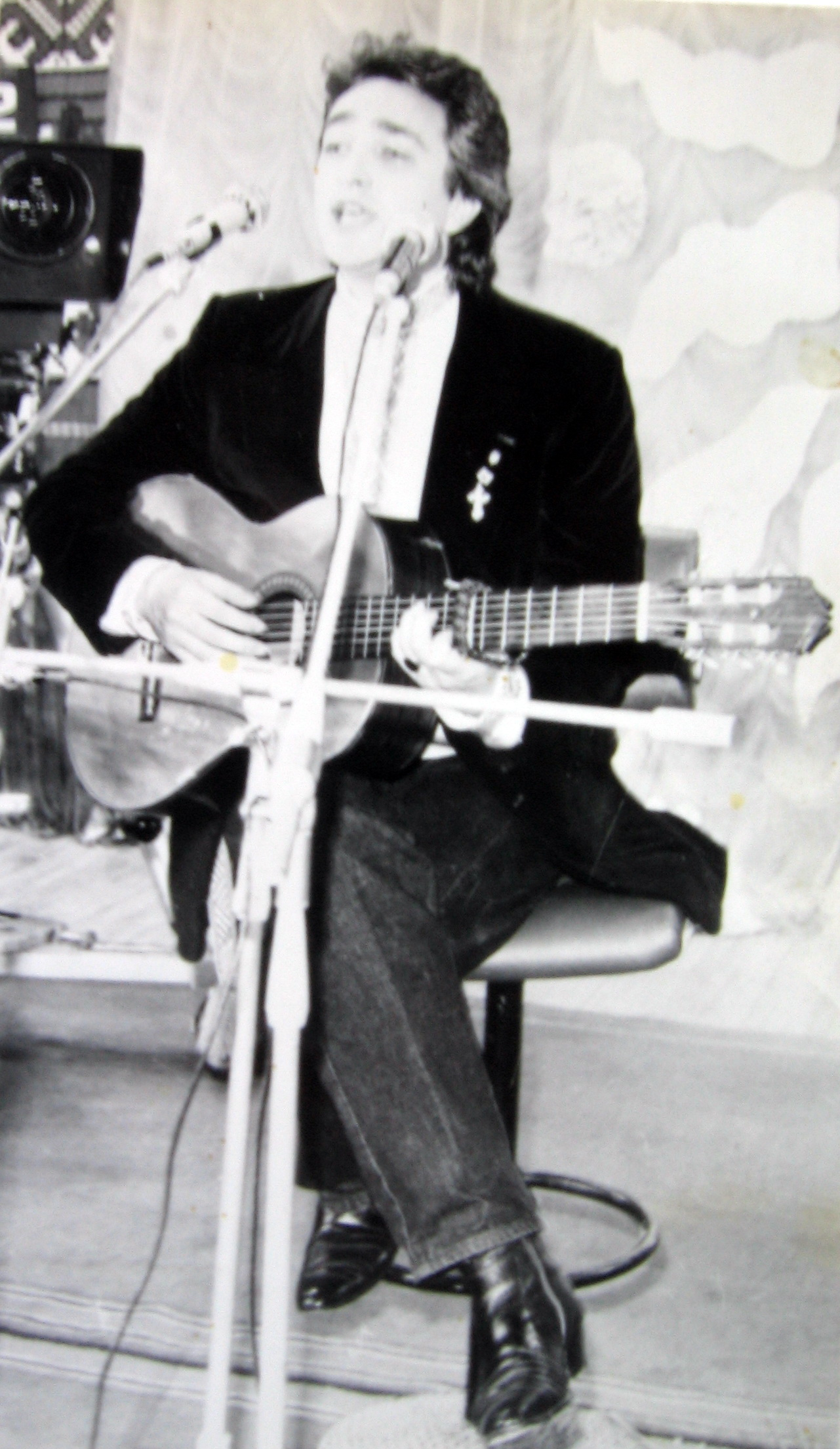
- Danchyk at a concert in Minsk in 1989
- Born: January 3, 1958 (age 68); New York City, New York, United States
- Occupations: journalist and former singer
- Awards: Belarusian Democratic Republic 100th Jubilee Medal (2018)

Bohdan Andrusyshyn (Note: Belarusian: Багдан Андрусішын, romanized: Bahdan Andrusishyn) (born January 3, 1958, also known under his stage name Danchyk) (Note: Belarusian: Данчык, romanized: Danchyk) is a Belarusian journalist and former singer.

== Biography ==
Andrusyshyn was born in New York City to a Ukrainian father and a Belarusian mother. In 1981 he graduated from the public communications faculty of the University of New York. At the same year, he had his first concert tour in Podlachia, eastern Poland, home to a large Belarusian minority.

In 1989, he for the first time visited Belarus and had several concerts there. His second tour to Belarus took place in 1996. Danchyk gained significant popularity, especially among Belarusian language speakers.

In 1997, Danchyk stopped his singing career and concentrated on working for the Belarusian edition of Radio Free Europe.

== Discography ==
- Беларусачка, Biełarusačka (Belarusian Girl), 1978
- Мы адной табе належым, My adnoj tabie naležym (It's Only You We Belong to, together with Lyavon Bartkevich), 1985
- Я ад вас далёка, Ja ad vas daloka (I Am Far From You), 1985, re-released in 2005
- Калядныя песьні, Kaladnyja pieśni (Christmas Songs), 1996
