= Maks Ščur =

Belarusian translator, writer and poet (born 1977)

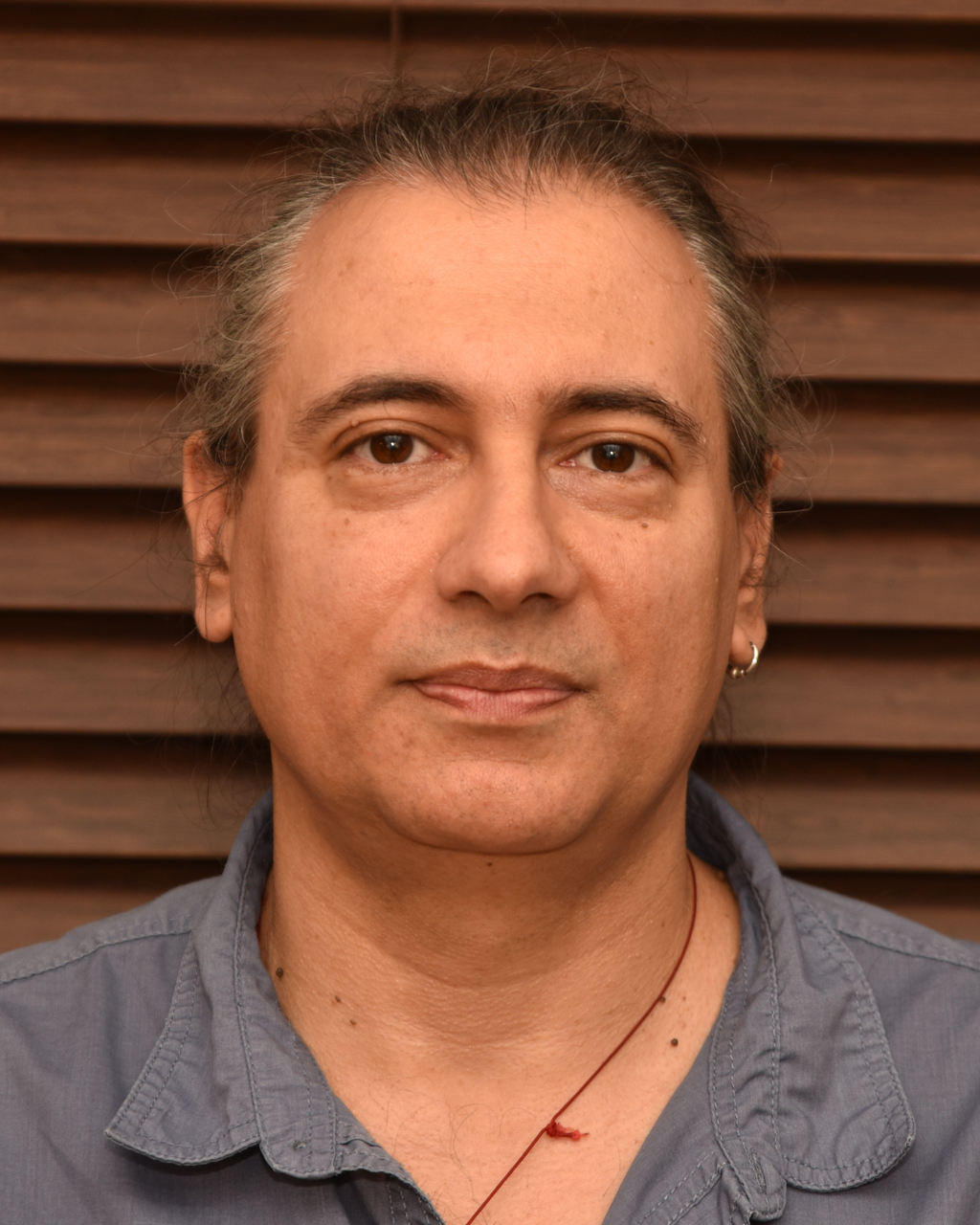
Ščur in 2023

Maksim Ščur (Belarusian: Макс Шчур; born 5 December 1977 in Brest, Belarus) is a Belarusian translator, writer and poet.

From 1994 until 1998, he was a student at the Minsk State Linguistic University. He has been living in Prague, Czech Republic since 1998. His notable novels are written in Czech, Swedish and Polish language including Śmierć tyrana (Сьмерць тырана, 1997), Amfiteatar (Амфітэатар, Prague-Gdansk, 1999), Rańni zbor (Раньні збор, Stockholm 2006), Amalhama (Амальгама, Mińsk 2010). In 2004, he was awarded for Janki Juchnauca for his novel Tam dzie nas niama (Там дзе нас няма).

In March 2026, a Belarusian court added Maks Ščur's book Tam dzie nas niama to the list of extremist materials.
