= Alhierd Bacharevič =

Belarusian writer and translator (born 1975)

- Альгерд Бахарэвіч
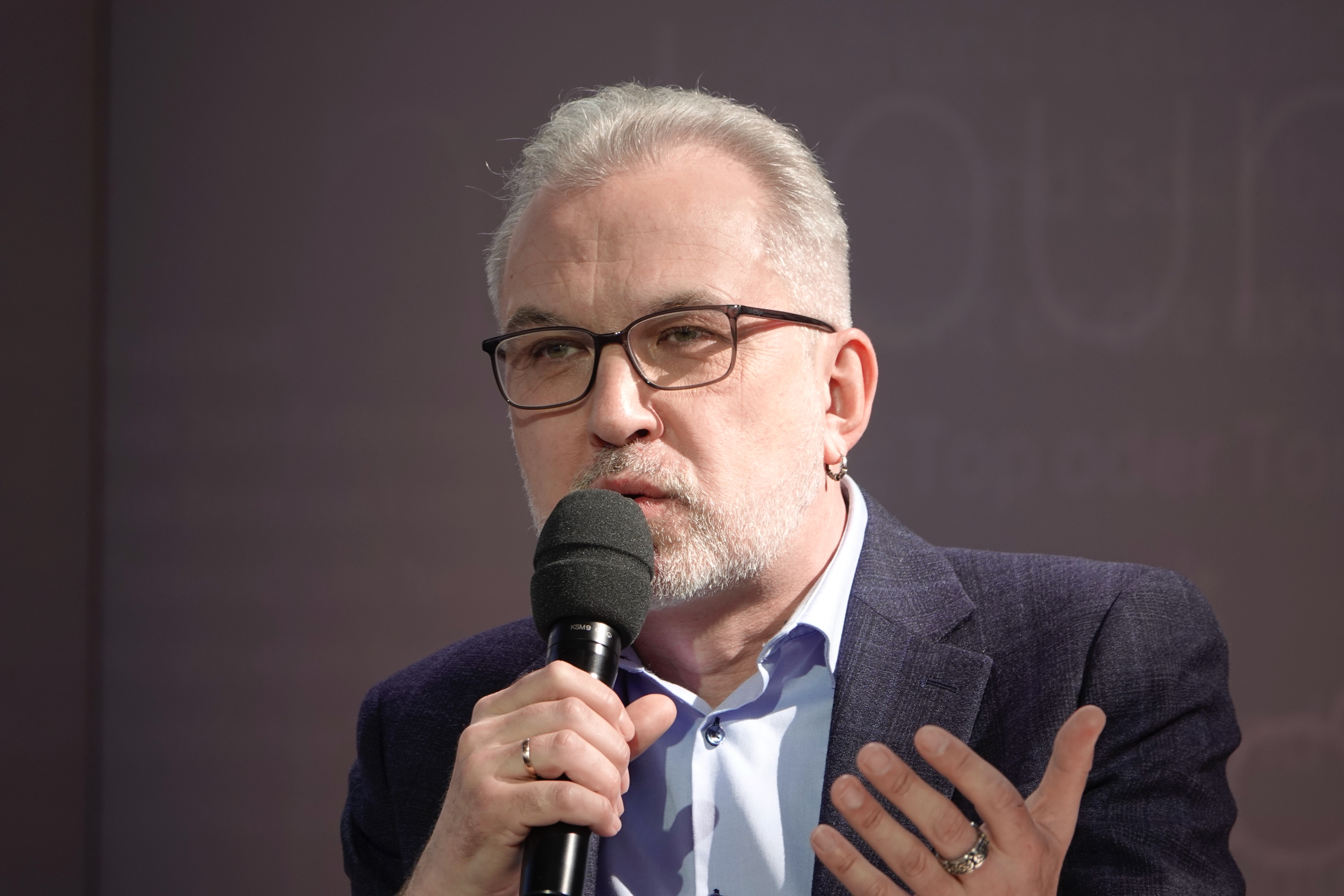
- Bacharevič in 2025
- Born: Aleh Ivanavič Bacharevič; 31 January 1975 (age 51); Minsk, Belarus
- Education: Maxim Tank Belarusian State Pedagogical University
- Occupations: Writer, translator
- Spouses: Ksienija Baharevič (née Brečka), Julija Cimafiejeva (2013-present)
- Children: Uljana (daughter)
- Writing career
- Language: Belarusian
- Years active: 1993-present

Alhierd Bacharevič (Belarusian: Альгерд Бахарэвіч, born 31 January 1975 in Minsk) is a Belarusian writer and translator. Born Aleh Ivanavič Bacharevič, he adopted his nom-de-plume (which refers to Algirdas, the medieval ruler of the Grand Duchy of Lithuania) in his first literary publications in 1993. In 1997 he graduated from the Philological Faculty of the Belarusian Pedagogical University in Minsk. Afterward, Bacharevič worked as a teacher of Belarusian and then as a journalist. His first texts were published in 1993. In the 1990s, he was one of the founders of the Belarusian literary and artistic avantgarde group Bum-Bam-Lit. In 1998, this group published the now cult anthology of their poetry, namely, Tazik biełaruski ('The Belarusian Basin'). At that time Bacharevič married Ksienija Brečka (Ксенія Брэчка). They have one daughter, Uljana (Ульяна). Between 2007 and 2013, Bacharevič lived in Hamburg, Germany. In 2013, he returned to Minsk and married the Belarusian translator and poet, Julia Cimafiejeva (Юля Цімафеева Yulya Tsimafeyeva). They lived in the Belarusian capital and cooperated in the field of Belarusian literature and culture, until the 2020 Belarusian protests. Subsequently, in order to avoid persecution, the couple of authors chose emigration and left for Austria. Now he lives in Berlin.

== Writing career ==
Alhierd Bacharevič is the leading Belarusian-language author of novels, including the novels Magpie on the Gallows (Сарока на шыбеніцы, 2009), and Šabany: The Story of One Disappearance (Шабаны. Гісторыя аднаго зьнікненьня, 2012), Alindarka’s Children (Дзеці Аліндаркі, 2014), or White Fly, Murderer of Men (Белая муха, забойца мужчын, 2015). The publishing house Lohvinaŭ published an over 900-page novel in six parts Dogs of Europe (Сабакі Эўропы, 2017), which is deemed to be the writer's opus magnum. The novel received in Belarus the Book of the Year award and was noted in Belarus with the independent Reader's Prize and the second Jerzy Gedroyc Prize. In 2019, the Moscow publishing house Vremia published the Russian translation of this novel (Собаки Европы).

The works by Alhierd Bacharevič were translated into English, French, German, Czech, Ukrainian, Bulgarian, Slovene, Russian, Polish, Lithuanian. In 2008, a collection by Alhierd Bacharevič's selected stories was translated into Polish "Talent do jąkania się". In 2010, in Leipzig, the novel Magpie on the Gallows was published in German in the translation by Thomas Weiler. In 2015, the story of Bacharevič The Talent of Stuttering was included in the anthology of the best European short prose "Best European Fiction". In 2017, the Small Medical Encyclopedia by Bacharevič was published in Polish in the Lublin Warsztaty Kultury publishing house (translated by Mira Luksha). In 2018, the novel Children of Alindarki was published by the publishing house "Le ver a soie" in the French translation of Alena Lapatnoiva.

Alhierd Bacharevič translated the fairy tale The Cold Heart by Wilhelm Hauff, which was published at the end of 2009 under one cover with an independent work entitled The Translator's Afterword. Translated from the German language, individual works of the brothers Grimm, Franz Kafka, G. G. Evers, poems by Hans Enzensberger and other modern German poets and the novel by the modern German writer Kathrin Schmidt You will not die. He took part in the Berlin Literary Colloquium, the Theater Festival in Lublin (Poland), the Literary Festivals Vilenica (Slovenia), the Lesefest Osteuropa (Leipzig, Germany), The Month of Author Reading in Brno, international literary festivals in Sweden, Ukraine, Lithuania, Czech Republic and others. He has performed at international book fairs in Frankfurt, Leipzig, Warsaw, Lviv, Minsk. In 2014, he represented Belarus at the International European Writers Conference in Berlin.

In 2012, after the members' angry reaction to the publication of Alhierd Bacharevič's essay The Dark Past of Kajan Łupaka on Janka Kupała in 2011, he left the Union of Belarusian Writers. He had been a member of this Union since 2006. Bacharevič is a member of the Belarusian PEN Club.

In 2015, a performance was staged on the Small Stage of the Yanka Kupala State Theater based on the novel Šabany by Alhierd Bacharevič.

In mid-2020 Bacharevič resigned from continuing work on his new fantasy-cum-political fiction novel Сьвятая Кацярына Śviataja Kaciaryna [Saint Catherine] (after having completed over 400 pages), because unexpectedly the socio-political reality of the Belarusian pro-democracy Peaceful Revolution accelerated beyond the book's original plot. The novel coalesced around the arrival of a female extraterrestrial on Earth and the revolution that she triggered. However, in the author's words, 'Mrs Śviatłana Cichanoŭskaja fell from the sky to Minsk, so the manuscript was set aside,' because meanwhile, according to Bacharevič, a peaceful revolution commenced in Belarus. The novelist proposes that despite violent repressions this revolution still continues, directed against the 'regime of the fascist type.'

Following the Belarus's involvement in the Russian invasion of Ukraine in 2022, on 2 March 2022, Bacharevič's open letter to the Ukrainians was published, in which he stated: 'I am prepared to take upon myself the shame and disgrace of Belarus for what is happening – in exactly the same way as German writers in the emigration did in the times of the Second World War'.

Due to his principled stance, the Belarusian regime's propagandists began to attack and denigrate Bacharevič in the pro-regime Belarusian press. On 17 May 2022, his novel Сабакі Эўропы Sabaki Eŭropy [Dogs of Europe] was banned in Belarus by placing it on the 'list of extremist material.' In mid-June 2022, the Belarusian Ministry of Education ordered the country's school libraries to be cleansed of the books by over 30 proscribed 'extremist' writers, including. In late July 2022, the authorities decided that the confiscated copies of Bacharevič's 'extremist' novel Сабакі Эўропы Sabaki Eŭropy [Dogs of Europe] would be destroyed by ploughing them by a tractor into a field. In March 2023, another book of Baharevich, Апошняя кніга пана А. Apošniaja kniha pana A. [Mr. A's Latest Book] was included in the list of extremist materials.

== Novels, volumes of short stories and essays ==
- 2002 – Практычны дапаможнік па руйнаваньні гарадоў. Проза, 1997–2001 Praktyčny dapamožnik pa rujnavańni haradoŭ. Proza, 1997–2001 [A Practical Guide to Ruining Cities: Stories, 1997–2001]. St Petersburg: Run' and Vilnius: OOO Nevskii prostor. ISBN 5947160129
- 2003 – Натуральная афарбоўка. Раман і апавяданні Naturalnaja afarboŭka. Raman i apaviadanni [Natural Dye: A Novel and Stories]. Miensk: Lohvinaŭ. ISBN 9856701228
- 2006 – Ніякай літасьці Валянціне Г. Апавяданні Nijakaj litaści Valiancinie H. Apaviadanni [No Mercy for Valiancina H.: Stories]. Miensk: Lohvinaŭ. ISBN 9856800099
- 2008 – Праклятыя госьці сталіцы Prakliatyja hości stalicy [Damned Guests of the Capital]. Miensk: Lohvinaŭ. ISBN 978-9856800682
- 2008 – Talent do jąkania się / Талент заіканьня [Talent for Stuttering] (a bilingual collection of short stories in Belarusian and Polish translation). Wrocław: Kolegium Europy Wschodniej im. Jana Nowaka-Jeziorańskiego. ISBN 978-8389185808
- 2009 – Сарока на шыбеніцы Saroka na šybienicy [Magpie on the Gallows]. Miensk: Lohvinaŭ. ISBN 978-9856901082
  - German translation: Die Elster auf dem Galgen [translated from the Belarusian by Thomas Weiler] (Ser: Neue Prosa Osteuropa-Bibliothek). 2010. Leipzig: Leipziger Literaturverlag. ISBN 9783866601048
  - Polish translation: Sroka na szubienicy [translated from the Belarusian by Igor Maksymiuk and Jan Maksymiuk] (Ser: Meridian). 2021. Sejny: Pogranicze, 456pp. ISBN 9788366143340
- 2009 – Introduction to and the Belarusian translation from the German of Халоднае сэрца: казка Chałodnaje serca: kazka [Das kalte Herz / The Cold Heart] by Вільгельм Гаўф Wilhelm Hauff. Miensk: Halijafy. ISBN 978-9856906308
- 2011 – Малая мэдычная энцыкляпэдыя Бахарэвіча Malaja medyčnaja encykliapedyja Bachareviča [Bacharevič's Small Medical Encyclopedia]. Prague: Radyjo Svaboda. ISBN 978-0929849409
  - Polish translation: Mały leksykon medyczny według Bacharewicza [translated by Mirosława Łuksza]. Lublin: Warsztaty Kultury. ISBN 9788364375224
- 2012 – Шабаны. Гісторыя аднаго зьнікненьня Šabany. Historyja adnaho źniknieńnia [Šabany: The Story of One Disappearance]. Miensk: Halijafy. ISBN 978-9856906681 (2nd edition in 2015, ISBN 978-9857140039)
  - Theater adaptation: Šabany (directed by Алена Ганум Aljena Hanum). 2014. Miensk: Janka Kupała National Theatre.
- 2012 – Гамбурскі рахунак Бахарэвіча Hamburski rachunak Bachareviča [Bacharevič's Hamburg Account]. Prague: Radyjo Svaboda and Miensk: Lohvinaŭ. ISBN 9780929849508, 978-9855620120
- 2014 – Каляндар Бахарэвіча Kaliandar Bachareviča [Bacharevič's Calendar]. Prague: Radyjo Svaboda. ISBN 978-0929849645
- 2014 – Ніякай літасьці Альгерду Б. Nijakaj litaści Alhierdu B. [No Mercy for Alhierd B.]. Miensk: Halijafy. ISBN 978-9857021512
- 2014 – Дзеці Аліндаркі Dzieci Alindarki [Alindarka's Children]. Miensk: Halijafy. ISBN 978-9857021710
  - French translation: Les enfants d'Alendrier [translated from the Belarusian by Alena Lapatniova] (Ser: 200 000 signes). 2018. Les Essarts-le-Roi: le Ver à soie-Virginie Symaniec éditrice. ISBN 9791092364316
  - Scots-English translation: Alindarka's Children [Belarusian-language sections translated into Scots by Petra Reid; Russian-language sections translated into English by Jim Dingley]. 2020. Edinburgh: Scotland Street Press, 188pp. ISBN 978-1-910895-40-5
  - US edition: Alindarka's Children [Belarusian-language sections translated into Scots by Petra Reid; Russian-language sections translated into English by Jim Dingley]. 2022. New York: New Directions.ISBN 9780811231961, 352pp.
  - 2nd edition: Дзеці Аліндаркі Dzieci Alindarki. 2024. Warsaw: Кнігаўка Knihaŭka. ISBN 9788368202175, 252pp.
  - Ukrainian translation: Діти Аліндарка Dity Alindarka [translated by Лэсік Панасюк Lesik Panasiuk і Дарына Гладун Daryna Hladun]. 2025. Kyiv: Видавничий дім «Стилос» Vydavnichyi dim «Stylos». ISBN 9789662399806, 292pp.
- 2015 – Белая муха, забойца мужчын Biełaja mucha, zabojca mužčyn [White Fly, Men Killer]. Miensk: Halijafy. ISBN 978-9857140077
  - Russian translation: Белая муха, убийца мужчин Belaia mukha, ubiitsa muzhchin [translated from the Belarusian by Alhierd Bacharevič]. 2017. Miensk: Halijafy. ISBN 9789857140312
- 2016 – Бэзавы і чорны. Парыж праз акуляры беларускай літаратуры Bezavy i čorny. Paryž praz akuliary biełaruskaj litaratury [Lilac and Black: Paris Through the Prism of Belarusian Literature]. Miensk: Zimcier Kołas. ISBN 978-9857164240
- 2017 – Сабакі Эўропы Sabaki Eŭropy [Dogs of Europe]. Vilnius: Lohvinaŭ. ISBN 978-6098213218
  - Russian translation: Собаки Европы Sobaki Evropy [translated from the Belarusian by Alhierd Bacharevič] (Ser: Samoe vremia!). 2019. Moscow: Vremia. ISBN 978-5969118362
  - Theater adaptation (1, in English): Belarus Free Theatre. 2019. Dogs of Europe (directed by Mikałaj Chaliezin)
  - Theater adaptation (2, in Polish): Independent Theater Group Kupalaŭcy. 2022. Gęsi – ludzie – łabędzie [Geese – People – Swans] (directed by Aliaksandar Harcujeŭ). Lublin: Juliusz Osterwa Theater.
  - 2nd edition. 2021. Miensk: A. M. Januškievič. ISBN 9789857210831, 680pp.
  - 3rd edition. 2022. Prague: Vesna / Viasna Books. ISBN 9788090868724, 676pp.
  - German translation: Europas Hunde [translated from the Belarusian by Thomas Weiler]. 2024. Berlin: Verlag Voland & Quist. ISBN 9783863913151, 744pp.
  - Сабакі Эўропы Sabaki Eŭropy [narrated by Сяргей Шупа Sjarhiej Šupa]. 2025. Беларускія аўдыякнігі. NB: Parts 1–3.
- 2018 – Мае дзевяностыя Maje dzievianostyja [My 1990s]. Miensk: A. M. Januškievič. ISBN 978-9857165896
  - 2nd edition, 2021, Miensk: A. M. Januškievič.
- 2019 – Berlin, Paris und das Dorf. Essays [Berlin, Paris and the Village: Essays] [translated from the Belarusian into German by Thomas Weiler and Tina Wünschmann]. Berlin: edition.fotoTAPETA, 96 pp. ISBN 978-3940524812
- 2020 – Апошняя кніга пана А. Apošniaja kniha pana A. [Mr. A's Latest Book]. Prague: Viasna and Miensk: A. M. Januškievič, 500pp. ISBN 978-8090735927 (Vesna Vaško, Praha) and ISBN 978-9857210541 (А. М. Янушкевіч, Мінск)
  - Audiobook: Апошняя кніга пана А. Apošniaja kniha pana A. [narrated by Ісай Свістулькін Isaj Svistulkin]. 2022. Беларускія аўдыякнігі.
  - German translation: Das letzte Buch von Herrn A. [translated from the Belarusian by Alhierd Bacharevič and Andreas Rostek]. 2023. Berlin: edition.fotoTAPETA. ISBN 9783949262234, 464pp.
- 2021 – Sie haben schon verloren. Revolution und Revolte in Belarus [They Have Already Lost: Revolution and Revolt in Belarus]. Berlin: edition.fotoTAPETA, 70 pp. ISBN 978-3949262050
- 2021 – Плошча Перамогі Płošča Peramohi [Victory Square], 160 pp (e-book). ISBN 9785043518668
  - Paper edition. 2023. Prague: Vesna / Viasna Books. ISBN 9788090868762, 244pp.
  - Audiobook: Плошча Перамогі Płošča Peramohi [narrated by Сяргей Шупа Sjarhiej Šupa]. 2024. Беларускія аўдыякнігі.
  - Swedish translation: Segertorget [translated from the Belarusian by Stefan Eriksson]. 2025. Stockholm: Ersatz. ISBN 9789189906303, 160pp.
- 2021 – Тэатр шчаслівых дзяцей Teatr ščaślivych dziaciej [The Theater of Happy Children], 170 pp (e-book). ISBN 9785043518668. (A single paper copy of this novel was published, as a performance act of creative art, for a charity auction. The successful anonymous buyer paid €1,250. All proceeds from the auction were used to support repressed authors and cultural activists in Belarus).
  - Audiobook: Тэатр шчаслівых дзяцей Teatr ščaślivych dziaciej [narrated by Алег Гарбуз Aleh Harbuz]. 2024. Беларускія аўдыякнігі and Кніжны Воз.
- 2022 – L'Art d'être bègue: Suivi d'autres textes sur le fascisme [The Art of Stuttering and Other Texts on Fascism]. Les Essarts-le-roi, France: Le ver à soie. ISBN 9791092364552, 110pp.
- 2023 – Хлопчык і снег Chłopčyk i śnieh [The Little Boy and Snow]. (An autobiography devoted to the author's childhood in the Soviet Union; a prequel to the 2018 volume Мае дзевяностыя Maje dzievianostyja [My 1990s]. The Miensk publishing house A. M. Januškievič planned to release this book in 2021, but repressions in Belarus intervened.) Warsaw: Knihaŭka. ISBN 9788396719058, 240pp.
- 2023 – Ператрус у музеі Pieratrus u muzei [A Police Search in the Museum]. Warsaw: Knihaŭka. ISBN 9788396719072.
- 2024 – Капітан Лятучая Рыба Kapitan Liatučaja Ryba [Captain Flying Fish] (illustrated by Lavon Volski). Warsaw: Januškievič (Knihaŭka). ISBN 9788368202007, 376pp.
- 2024 – Папяровы голем Papierovy Holem [Paper Golem]. Warsaw: Knihaŭka.ISBN 9788368202120, 220pp.
  - German translation: Golem aus Papier [translated from the Belarusian by Magdalena Voigt]. 2025. Berlin: edition.fotoTAPETA. ISBN 978-3949262531, 144pp.
- Forthcoming – Аўгуры Aŭhury [Auguri]

== Poetry and short stories ==
- 2019 Spomenik Običnom Čovjeku [A Monument to the Common Man] (poem translated from the Belarusian into Croatian by Vesna Vaško Cáceres and Siarhiej Šupa]. Ajfelov most. May 5. (NB: The Belarusian-language original Помнік простаму чалавеку Pomnik prostamu čałavieku circulates on the web.)
- 2022 Vieršy Вершы [Poems]. Prague: Vydaviectva Viasna Выдавецтва Вясна.ISBN 9788090735958, 142pp. NB: Each poem is given in Łacinka and Cyrillic.

== Essays ==
- 2020 Последнее слово детства. Фашизм как воспоминание Poslednee slovo detstva. Fashizm kak vospominanie [The Last Glimpse of Childhood: Fascism as Memory]. pen/opp: Swedish PEN: Freedom of Expression, Literature and Culture. 7 Dec.
  - English translation: Fascism as Memory [translated from Russian by Jim Dingley]. 2020. pen/opp: Swedish PEN: Freedom of Expression, Literature and Culture. 7 Dec.
  - German translation: Mit der Angst um den Hals [translated from the Russian by Mariya Donska and Gisela Zeindlinger]. 2021. Dekoder. 5 Jan
  - Swedish translation: Fascismen vi minns. 2020. pen/opp: Swedish PEN: Freedom of Expression, Literature and Culture. 7 Dec.
  - Ukrainian translation: Останнє слово дитинства. Фашизм як спогад Ostannye slovo dytynstva. Fashyzm iak spohad [translated from the Russian by Ія Ківа Iia Kiva]. 2020. Український центр Міжнародного ПЕН-клубу/PEN Ukraine. 29 Dec.
- 2021 Worte kommen immer zu spät [Words Always Come Too Late]. 2021. Frankfurter Allgemeine Zeitung. 28 May.
- 2022 Fqinjët që nuk kanë qenë kurrë të tillë [Neighbors, Who never Were]. 2022. Gazeta Express. 8 Jun [ Bardhyl Selimi's Albanian translation of Tomasz Kamusella's English translation of the Belarusian original: ‘Суседзі, якіх не было Susiedzi, jakich nie było’ (pp. 68–72). In: Альгерд Бахарэвіч Alhierd Bacharevič. 2014. Ніякай літасьці Альгерду Б. Nijakaj litaści Alhierdu B. Мінск Minsk: Галіяфы Halijafy. ISBN 9789857021512]

== Bacharevič's Translations ==
- 2009 – Халоднае сэрца: казка Chałodnaje serca: kazka [Das kalte Herz / The Cold Heart] by Вільгельм Гаўф Wilhelm Hauff. Miensk: BiełTonMedyja. NB: E-book & audiobook. ISBN 978-9856906308. Translation of Wilhelm Hauff. Das kalte Herz.
- 2011 – Ты не памрэш Ty nie pamreš [You Will Not Die]. Miensk: Makbeł. ISBN 978-9856347767. Translation of Kathrin Schmidt. Du stirbst nicht. Cologne: Kiepenheuer & Witsch.
- 2013 – Казкі братоў Грымаў Kazki bratoŭ Hrymaŭ [ Grimms' Fairy Tales ]. Vilnius: Lohvinaŭ.
- 2015 – Халоднае сэрца: казка Chałodnaje serca: kazka [Das kalte Herz / The Cold Heart] by Вільгельм Гаўф Wilhelm Hauff. Miensk: Knihazbor. ISBN 978-9857119622. Translation of Wilhelm Hauff's Das kalte Herz.
- 2017 – Белая муха, убийца мужчин Belaia mukha, ubiitsa muzhchin [White Fly, Men Killer]. Miensk: Halijafy. ISBN 9789857140312. Translation of Alhierd Bacharevič. Белая муха, забойца мужчын Biełaja mucha, zabojca mužčyn. Miensk: Halijafy.
- 2018 – Што было б Što było b [Was gewesen wäre / What Would Be] by Грэгар Зандэр Gregor Sander. Miensk: Lohvinau. ISBN 9786098213461. Translation of Georg Sander's Was gewesen wäre.
- 2019 – Собаки Европы Sobaki Evropy [Dogs of Europe]. Moscow: Vremia. ISBN 978-5969118362. Translation of Alhierd Bacharevič. Сабакі Эўропы Sabaki Eŭropy [Dogs of Europe]. Vilnius: Lohvinaŭ.

== Awards ==
- Winner of the 2002 award "Hliniany Viales" (Clay Wreath), for the collection of stories Практычны дапаможнік па руйнаваньні гарадоў. Проза, 1997–2001 Praktyčny dapamožnik pa rujnavańni haradoŭ. Proza, 1997–2001 [A Practical Guide to Ruining Cities: Stories, 1997–2001]
- Winner of the "Book of the Year 2012: Jerzy Giedroyc Literary Award: Second Place", for the collection of essays Малая мэдычная энцыкляпэдыя Бахарэвіча Malaja medyčnaja encykliapedyja Bachareviča [Bacharevič's Small Medical Encyclopedia]
- Winner of the "Book of the Year 2013: Jerzy Giedroyc Literary Award: Second Place", for the collections of essays on Belarusian literature and writers Гамбурскі рахунак Бахарэвіча Hamburski rachunak Bachareviča [Bacharevič's Hamburg Account]
- Winner of the Belarusian PEN Center's award "Book of the Year 2014", for the novel Дзеці Аліндаркі Dzieci Alindarki [Alindarka's Children].
- Winner of the "Book of the Year 2015: Jerzy Giedroyc Literary Award: Third Place", for the novel Дзеці Аліндаркі Dzieci Alindarki [Alindarka's Children].
- Winner of the Belarusian PEN Center's award "Book of the Year 2017", for the novel Сабакі Эўропы Sabaki Eŭropy [Dogs of Europe]
- Winner of the award "Book of the Year 2018: Jerzy Giedroyc Literary Award: Second Place", for the novel Сабакі Эўропы Sabaki Eŭropy [Dogs of Europe].
- Readers' Prize (2018) for the novel Сабакі Эўропы Sabaki Eŭropy [Dogs of Europe]
- Winner of the 34th Erwin-Piscator-Preis (2021) awarded for 'his powerful work as one of the most significant Belarusian writers, exploring the conditions of totalitarian rule in monumental novels and profound essays.'
- Winner of the Leipzig Book Award for European Understanding (2025)

== Creative writing fellowships ==
- IHAG (Internationales Haus der AutorInnen, Graz, Austria), 2006
- German PEN Center, Writers in Exile Grant, 2008–2011
- Heinrich Böll Foundation, 2011
- Baltic Writers and Translators Center, Visby
- Institut Français, Center International de Recollets, 2016
- Literarisches Colloquium Berlin, 2018
- "Writer in Exile"-Programm, City of Graz, Internationales Haus der Autorinnen und Autoren Graz, Kulturvermittlung Steiermark. 2020–2021, prolonged until December 2022, under the aegis of the Kaffeehausliteratur-Stipendium.

== Facts ==
In the 1990s he was the founder and vocalist of the first Belarusian-language punk band Правакацыя ('Provocation').

In March 2022 Bacharevič publicly expressed his opinion about the Russian invasion in Ukraine and declared that “we have the same enemy: the Belarusians, the Ukrainians, the Lithuanians, and even the Russians. And this enemy is Putin's empire, Putinism, Putin's fascism!”.

As of 2023, Bacharevič remains in exile in Switzerland.

== See also ==
Bacharevič's public fb site.
