= Uładzimir Arłou =

Belarusian writer and politician

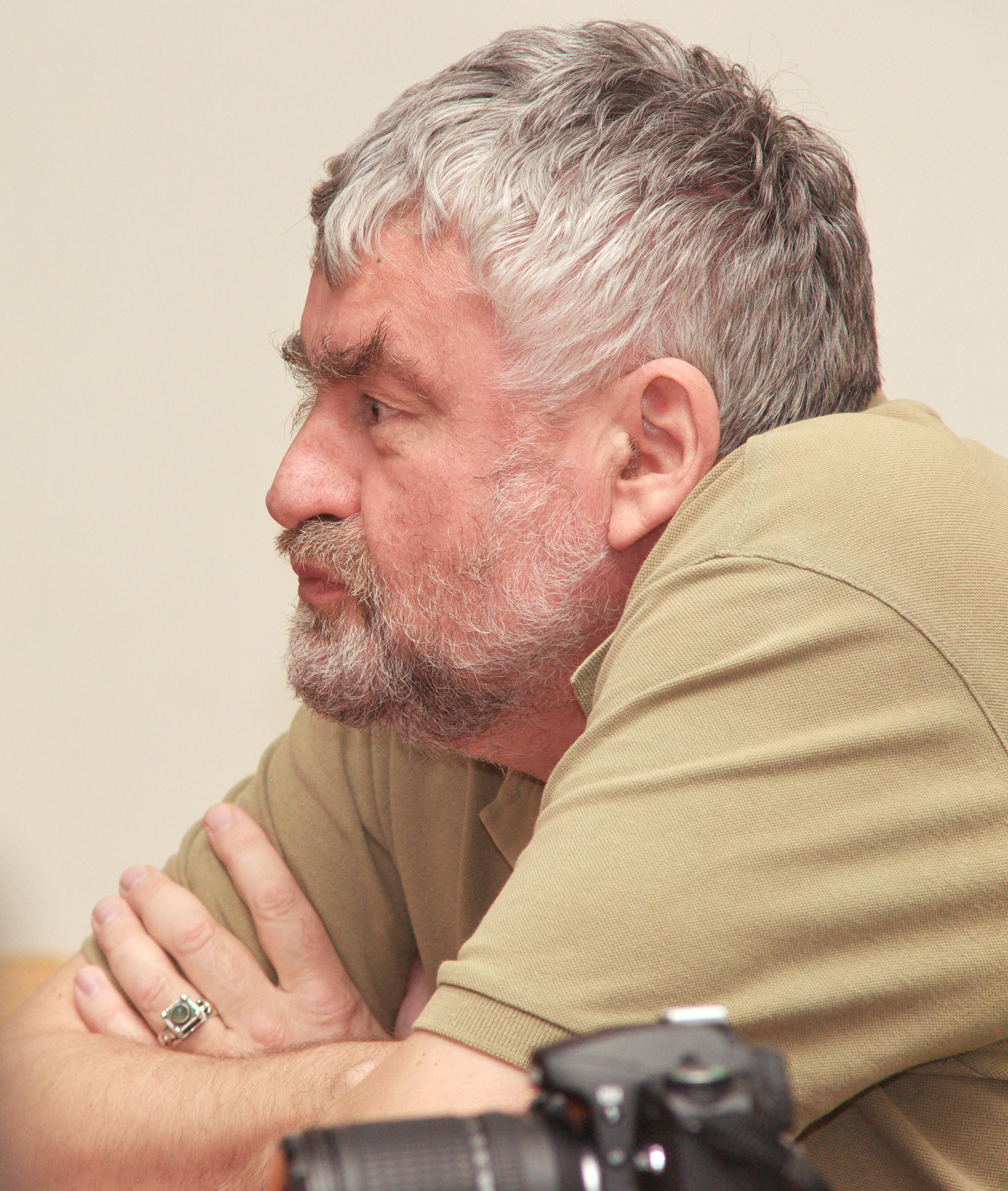
Uładzimier Arłou in 2010

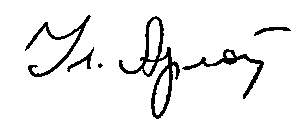
Uładzimir Arłou's signature

Uładzimir Arłou, known as U. A. Arlou (Belarusian: Уладзімір Аляксеевіч Арлоў, Russian: Владимир Алексеевич Орлов, romanized: Vladimir Aljakseevich Orlov; born 25 August 1953 in Polotsk, Byelorussian SSR, Soviet Union) is a Belarusian historian, writer, politician, and poet. He is chairman of the Belarusian PEN International.

== Biography ==
Uladzimier Arloŭ was born into a family of intelligentsia. His mother was a teacher of history and his father held the position of a public prosecutor. In 1975 he graduated from the School of History of the Belarusian State University (BSU) and went on to work in Novopolotsk as a teacher of history (1975—1976), and then as a reporter, head of a department, and deputy editor-in-chief for the Chimik (Chemist) municipal paper (1976—1986). After he moved to Miensk he held the position of an editor at Mastackaja Litaratura Publishers (1988—1997). Uladzimier Arloŭ is a member of the Belarusian Writers’ Union and the Belarusian Centre of the International P.E.N. In 1988 he joined the Adradžeńnie (Revival) Belarusian People’s Front and was elected twice to its Sojm (Assembly). At present he does not belong to any political party. Uladzimier Arloŭ is a Uniate (Greek Catholic). He lives in Miensk.

== Creative work ==
Uladzimier Arloŭ published his debut poems in Blakitny Lichtar (Blue Lantern) student underground self-publish magazine in Navapolack in 1973. At the BSU he was one of the students who launched Milavica underground self-publish miscellany in Miensk (1974—1976). This was the reason why he was summoned to the KGB ‘for preventive conversations’. In the 1970s and the 1980s Uladzimier Arloŭ and Vinceś Mudroŭ took part in copying and distributing a number of Belarusian publications that were forbidden at the time, including the Russian-Belarusian (Kryvičian) Dictionary by Vaclaŭ Lastoŭski.

Uladzimier Arloŭ first won renown for his prose, including historical writings, and later on was also acclaimed as a remarkable essayist and poet.

He has written a great many books of prose, poetry, historical publications, and essays.

Uladzimier Arloŭ’s writings have been translated into a number of languages, including English, German, Polish, Swedish, Czech, Ukrainian, Hungarian, French, Romanian, Russian, Estonian, Lithuanian, Latvian, Slovak, and Georgian. His essay Independence, written in 1990, has been rendered into 25 languages. He also wrote scripts to popular science documentaries Eŭfrasińnia of Polacak, Polacak Mazes, Simiaon of Polacak and others.

Uladzimier Arloŭ translated There Was Such a Village by Mikalaj Ulaščyk from Russian into Belarusian in 1989, The Murder of Peter the Unknown by Valery Shevchuk in 1993 and Rovno/Rivne by Oleksandr Irvanets’ in 2007 from Ukrainian into Belarusian.

ARCHE journal has said that "Uladzimier Arloŭ masterfully writes historical prose and ironic essays. His filigree style and Rabelaisian humour have made him one Belarus’ most popular writers."

== Bibliography ==
(In Belarusian)

- Добры дзень, мая Шыпшына. Апавяданні, аповесць. — Мн., 1986
- День, калі ўпала страла. Аповесці і апавяданні. — Мн., 1988
- Асветніца з роду Усяслава. Ефрасіння Полацкая. — Мн., 1989
- Пока не погасла свеча. Повести и рассказы. — М., 1990
- Там, за дзвярыма. Вершы ў прозе. — Мн., 1991
- Рандэву на манеўрах. Аповесць. Апавяданні. — Мн., 1992
- Еўфрасіння Полацкая. Евфросиния Полоцкая. — Мн., 1992
- Прысуд выканаў невядомы. Ігнат Грынявіцкі. — Мн., 1992
- «Совершенно секретно», альбо Адзін у трох іпастасях. Літаратурна-публіцыстычныя артыкулы. Эсэ. — Мн., 1992
- Міласць князя Гераніма. Аповесці. Апавяданні. — Мн., 1992
- Мой радавод да пятага калена. Эсэ. — Мн., 1993
- Пяць мужчын у леснічоўцы. Аповесці. Апавяданні. — Мн., 1994
- Таямніцы полацкай гісторыі. Гістарычныя эсэ. — Мн., 1994, 2000, 2002, 2008
- Фаўна сноў. Вершы. — Мн., 1995
- Тайны полоцкой истории. Исторические эссе. — Мн., 1995, 2012
- Адкуль наш род. Апавяданні. — Мн., 1996; Вільня, 2000, 2003
- Рэквіем для бензапілы. Аповесці. Апавяданні. — Мн., 1998
- Божая кароўка зь Пятай авэню. Эсэ. — Мн., 1998
- Жыватворны сімвал Бацькаўшчыны. Гісторыя Крыжа святой Еўфрасінні Полацкай. Животворный символ Отчизны. История креста святой Евфросинии Полоцкой. — Мн., 1998
- Дзесяць вякоў беларускай гісторыі. (У суаўтарстве з Генадзем Сагановічам). 862—1918. Падзеі. Даты. Ілюстрацыі. — Вільня, 1999, 2000, 2002
- Еўфрасіння Полацкая. Жыццяпіс і даследаванне спадчыны асветніцы. — Мн., 2000
- Requiem dla piły motorowej. Proza. — Białystok, 2000
- Десять веков белорусской истории. 862—1918. События. Даты. Иллюстрации. (В соавторстве с Генадзем Сагановичем). — Вильня, 2001
- Сны імператара. Апавяданні. Аповесці. Эсэ. — Мн., 2001
- Краіна Беларусь. Ілюстраваная гісторыя. Мастак Зміцер Герасімовіч — Марцін (Славакія), 2003, Браціслава, 2012, 2013
- Ордэн Белай Мышы. Аповесці. Апавяданні. — Мн., 2003, 2013
- Адкусі галаву вароне. Эсэ. — Мн., 2003
- Каханак яе вялікасці. Гістарычныя апавяданні. Эсэ. — Мн., 2004
- Час чумы. Гістарычныя аповесці. Апавяданні. — Мн., 2005
- Реквієм для бензопилки. Оповідання та повість. — Київ, 2005
- Сланы Ганібала. Выбраныя эсэ. — Мн., 2005
- Ад Полацка пачаўся свет. Гістарычныя эсэ. — Мн., 2005
- Kochanek jej wysokości. Proza. — Wrocław. 2006
- Паром празь Ля-Манш. Вершы. — Мн., 2006
- Час чумы. Аўдыёкніга. — Мн., 2006
- Імёны Свабоды. — Радыё Свабодная Эўропа/Радыё Свабода, 2007, 2009, 2015, 2020
- Адкуль наш род. Аўдыёкніга. — Мн.,, 2007
- Таямніцы полацкай гісторыі. Аўдыёкніга. — Мн,, 2008
- Сны імператара. Аўдыёкніга. — Мн., 2008
- Паўстанцы. Аўдыёкніга. — Мн., 2008
- Паром празь Ля-Манш. Аўдыёкніга. — Мн., 2008
- Ордэн Белай Мышы. Аўдыёкніга. — Мн., 2008
- Prom przez kanał La Manche. Wiersze. — Gdańsk., 2009
- Усё па-ранейшаму толькі імёны зьмяніліся. Вершы. — Мн., 2009
- Ля Дзікага Поля. Гістарычныя апавяданні. Аповесць. Эсэ. — Мн., 2010
- Імёны Свабоды. Аўдыёкніга — Радыё Свабодная Эўропа/Радыё Свабода, 2011
- Пакуль ляціць страла. 100 пытаньняў пісьменьніку. — Радыё Свабодная Эўропа/Радыё Свабода, 2012
- Сьвецяцца вокны ды нікога за імі. Вершы. — Мн., 2012
- Краіна Беларусь: Вялікае Княства Літоўскае. Ілюстраваная гісторыя. Мастак Зміцер Герасімовіч. — Браціслава, 2012, 2013
- Страна Беларусь. Иллюстрированная история. Художник Змицер Герасимович. — Братислава, 2013
- This country called Belarus. An Illustrated History — Bratislava, 2013
- Ад Полацка пачаўся свет. My Polacak, the Cradle of the World — Мн., 2014
- Patria aeterna: apaviadańni — Miensk, 2015
- Айчына: маляўнічая гісторыя. Ад Рагнеды да Касцюшкі. Мастак Павел Татарнікаў. —Мн., 2016, 2017, 2019
- Танцы над горадам. Тры аповесці — Мн., 2017
- Краіна Ур. Вершы. — Мн., 2018
- Я марыў стаць шпіёнам. Выбраная проза. Мн., 2018
- Вустрыцы а пятай раніцы. Выбраныя эсэ. Мн., 2018
- Архіварыус Война. Гістарычная проза. Мн., 2018
- Танцы на горадам. Проза апошніх гадоў. Мн, 2018
- Belarus. The epoch of the Grand Duchy of Lithuania. An illustrated history. — Vilnius, 2018
- Faszination Belarus. Illustrierte Geschichte. Eines unbekannten landes. — Vilnius, 2018
- Паручнік Пятровіч і прапаршчык Здань. Балады — Мн., 2018
- Porucznik Piatrowicz i chorąży Duch. Ballady — Lublin, 2021
- Все як раніше лише імена змінилися. Вірші — Київ, 2021
- Краєвид з ментоловим ароматом. Коротка проза — Львів, 2021

== Awards ==
- 1986 — The Prize of the Belarusian Komsomol (Young Communists’ League) for Dobry Dzień, maja Šypšyna (My dear Šypšyna).
- 1990 — The Francišak Skaryna medal ‘for contribution to the subject of Belarusian history in literature’.
- 1993 — The Uladzimier Karatkievič Prize for the books Eŭfrasińnia Polackaja (Eŭfrasińnia of Polacak) and Randevu na manieŭrach (A Rendez-vous during the Manoeuvres).
- 1996 — The Francišak Bahuševič Literary Prize awarded by the Belarusian Centre of the International P.E.N. for Tajamnicy polackaj history (The Mysteries of Polacak History).
- 1998 — The Hliniany Vialies (Clay Vialies) Prize awarded by the Society of Free Writers for Božaja karoŭka ź Piataj Aveniu (A Ladybird from Fifth Avenue).
- 2004 — The Boris Kit Prize (Germany).
- 2006 — „Zalataya litera” prize for the collection of poems Parom praź La Manche (A Cross-Channel Ferry).
- 2010 — The European Poet of Freedom international prize (Poland) for Parom praź La Manche (A Cross-Channel Ferry).
- 2015 — The Golden Apostrophe Prize awarded by Dziejasloŭ literary journal for Tancy nad horadam (Dances above the City) novella.
- 2015 — Silver medal „Zasłużony Kulturze Gloria Artis” (Honoured Art Worker) (Poland).
- 2016 — The Aleko International Literary Prize (Bulgaria).
- 2016 — The Alieś Adamovič Literary Prize awarded by the Belarusian Centre of the International P.E.N. for Imiony Svabody (The Names of Freedom).
- 2017 — The Ciotka Prize for Ajčyna: maliaŭničaja historyja. Ad Rahniedy da Kaściuški (Belarus: an Illustrated History. From Rahnieda to Kaściuška).
- 2018 — The Jerzy Giedroyć Literary Award for Tancy nad horadam (Dances above the City).
- 2019 — The 100 Years of the Belarusian Democratic Republic medal awarded by the Council of the Belarusian Democratic Republic.
