= Belarus Solidarity Foundation =

Belarusian non-profit organization

Belarus Solidarity Foundation BYSOL
- Фонд беларускай салідарнасці BYSOL
- Founded: August 14, 2020
- Registration no.: 305670484
- Location: Vilnius, Lithuania
- Key people: Andrej Stryzhak (CEO)
- Website: bysol.org

Belarus Solidarity Foundation BYSOL is a non-profit organization established on August 14, 2020, as a response to violence that happened in Belarus after the 2020 Belarusian presidential election. BYSOL is aimed at raising funds to provide financial aid to victims of repression in Belarus.

== History ==
BYSOL was founded by Belarusians who were forced to leave the country because of the threat of repression. Its first office was located in Kyiv, Ukraine while the organization was registered in the Netherlands. Now, the organization consists of about 15 members, and the majority of them are located in Vilnius, Lithuania. After the team moved to Lithuania, the company was also registered there.

On December 3, 2021, the Ministry of Internal Affairs of the Republic of Belarus recognized the BYSOL Foundation as an extremist group. Creation of an extremist group or participation in it is a criminal offence in Belarus.

== Activity ==
Nowadays, BYSOL has four main assistance programs: support of courtyard initiatives, emergency relocation, support the families of political prisoners and helping those fired for political reasons. The Fund also provides an opportunity to start a personal fundraiser on the website. BYSOL also starts situational campaigns, for example, BYSOL raised funds to help veterans of the Second World War, when the Belarusian government refused to pay pensioners the required annual remuneration in honor of Victory Day, and children whose parents are political prisoners, to cover their school expenses.

In 2020, BYSOL raised €2.9 million to support those fired for political reasons, striking factories, and people forced to relocate.

As for August 7, 2021, BYSOL together with an organization called BY_help have raised about $7.8m to support Belarusians.

After the 2022 Russian invasion of Ukraine, BYSOL focused specifically on helping evacuate Belarusian political refugees from Ukraine.

For the start of school in 2022, the Belarus Solidarity Foundation, together with the fund "A Country to Live In", the Belarusian community "RAZAM" e.V., the Dissidentby initiative and the Littouwin Lions Club, organized a collection campaign to pay for school supplies for the children of political prisoners.

== Fundraising methods ==
BYSOL uses a variety of fundraising methods. This includes donations and grants. The methods by which the organization transfers money to Belarus remain secret.

== Facts ==
The Belarusian General Prosecutor's Office called covering the activity of BYSOL in their articles is one of the reasons for blocking the Independent Belarus media website TUT.BY.
