= Belarusian studies =

Science dedicated to Belarus research

Belarusian studies (Belarusian: Беларусазнаўства) is a field of research dedicated to Belarusian language, literature and culture.

== Emergence of the field ==
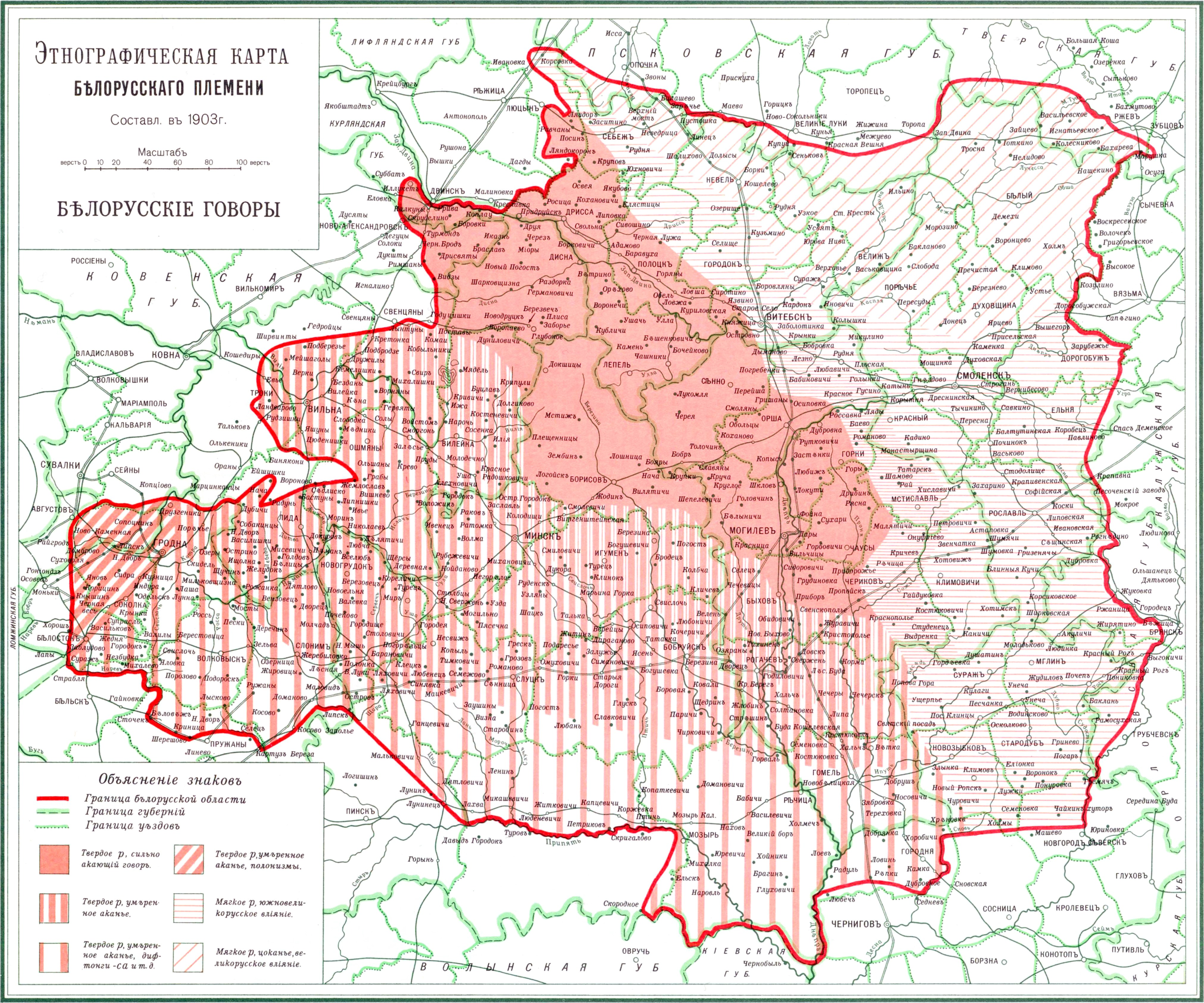
Belarusians. Ethnographic map by Karsky, 1903

Research on the language, ethnography and history of Belarusian lands was conducted from the beginning of the 19th century, initially within the framework of Polish and Russian studies. The first works devoted to Belarusian issues managed to arouse the curiosity of their roots among the then emerging Belarusian intelligentsia.

Yefim Karsky is often called "the father" of Belarusian studies. His main work is a book Belarusians in three volumes, that became a foundation of Belarusian linguistics.

In the nineteenth century, Belarusian research was started more boldly by the Belarusians themselves (Francišak Bahuševič, Karuś Kahaniec, H. Tatur). Under the tsarist rule, these studies, closely related to the national liberation movement, were practically conducted illegally and were developed through educational circles and societies by a small group of nationally conscious Belarusians.

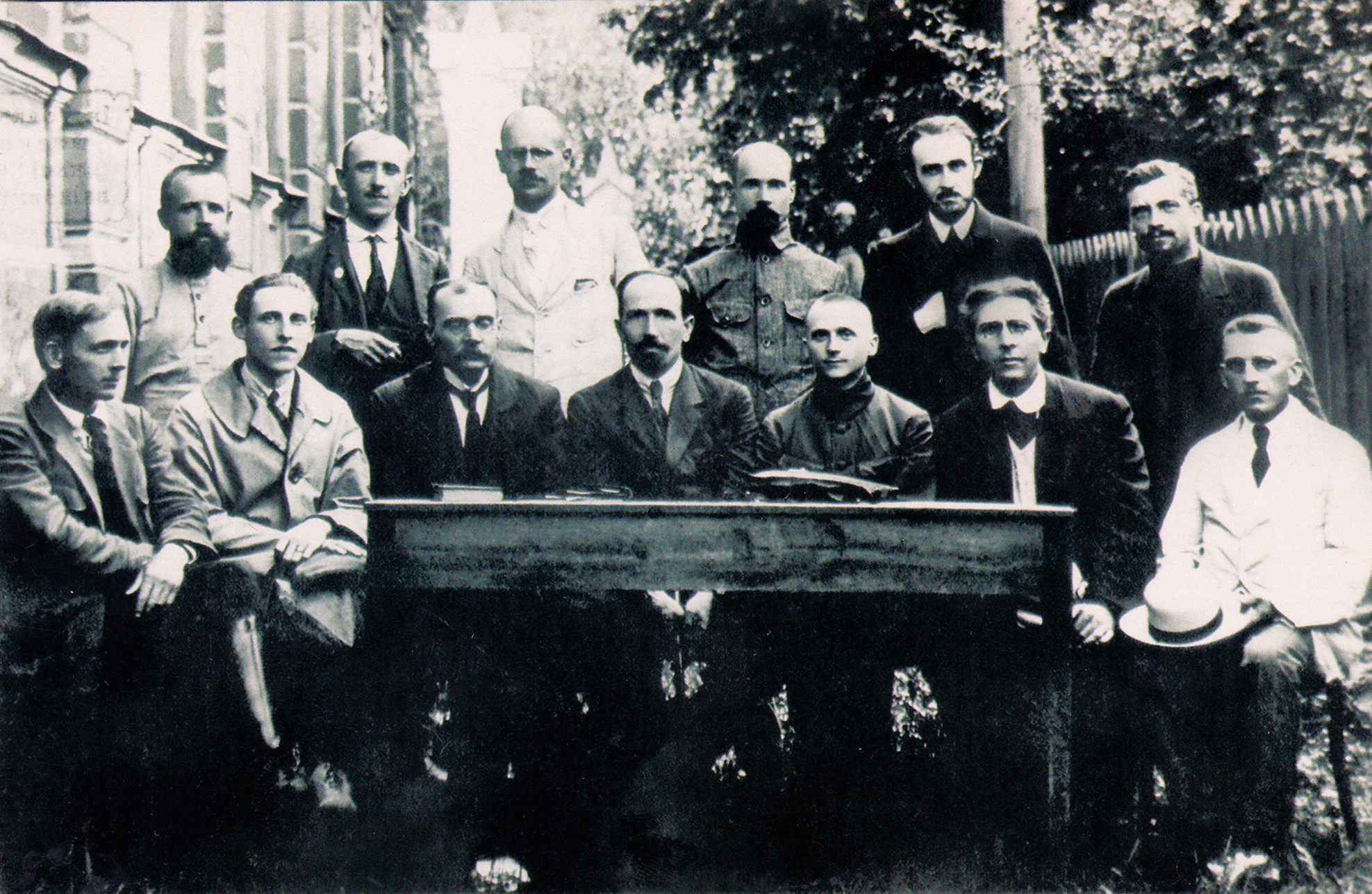
Scientists of the Institute of Belarusian Culture, 1922

Belarusian studies acquired legal forms after the revolution of 1905, when it became possible to support research by its own national periodical (headed by the Nasha Niva). It was the author of Nasha Niva, Vaclau Lastouski, who published the first scientific work in Belarusian, titled "Karotkaja historyja Biełarusi" (Consise Belarusian History, Vilnius, 1910).

Official state support for Belarusian studies was first received in the 1920s within the borders of the then Belarusian Soviet Socialist Republic. From 1922, scientific activities, including extensive Belarusian research, were conducted by the Institute of Belarusian Culture. At that time, scientific work in the field of Belarusian studies began to be comprehensive, Belarusian scientific terminology was developed. The development of Belarusian studies in the Soviet state was interrupted in the 1930s.

Outside the territories of Soviet Belarus, including Poland, Belarusian research was the domain of nationally conscious intelligentsia. In 1921, the Belarusian Scientific Society founded the Muzeum Białoruskie in Vilnius. There were also the Scientific Society of Franciszek Skaryna in Prague, the Belarusian National Committee in Chicago and the Belarusian Scientific Society in Riga.

== Belarusian studies abroad ==
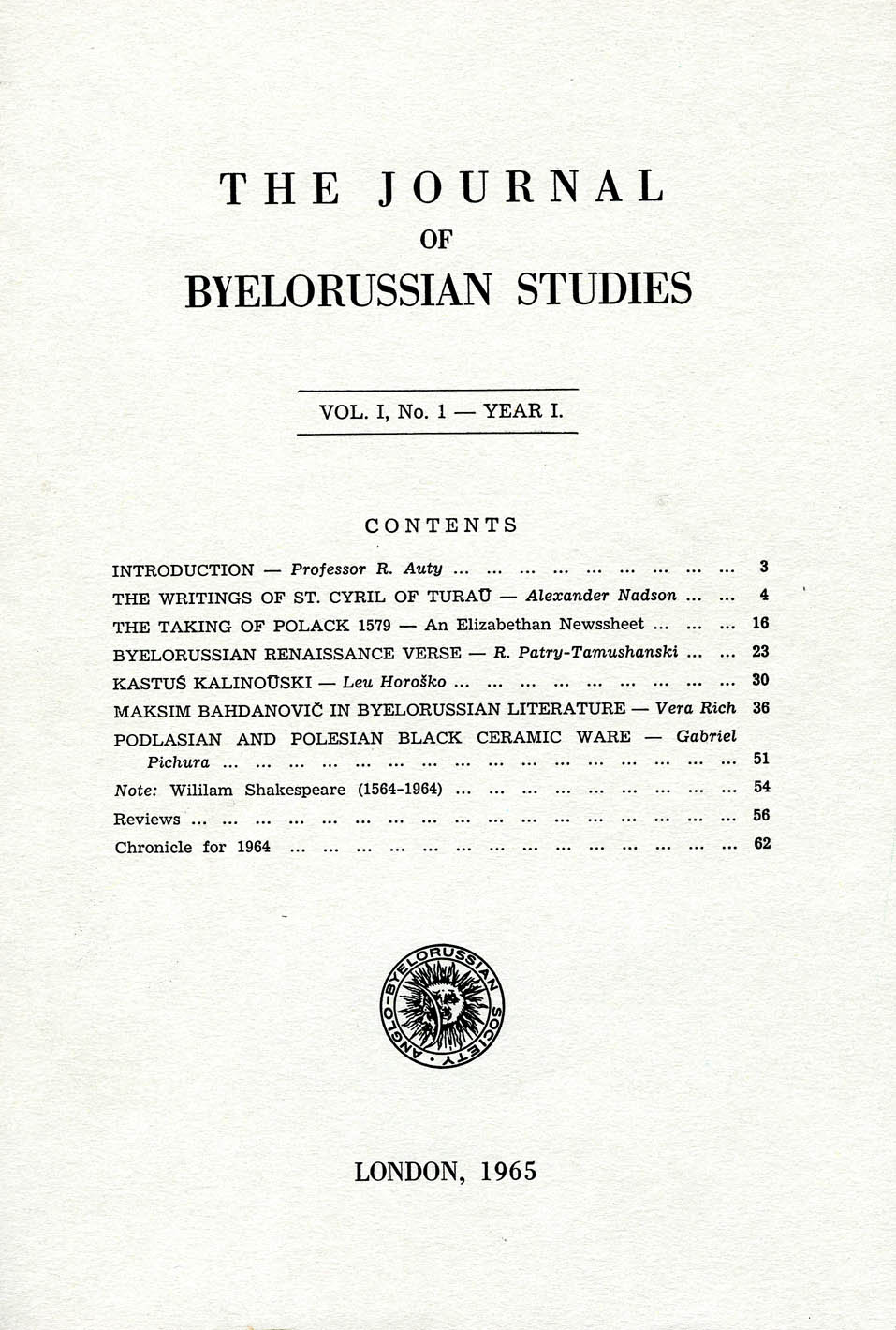
Cover page of the first issue of The Journal of Belarusian Studies (1965)

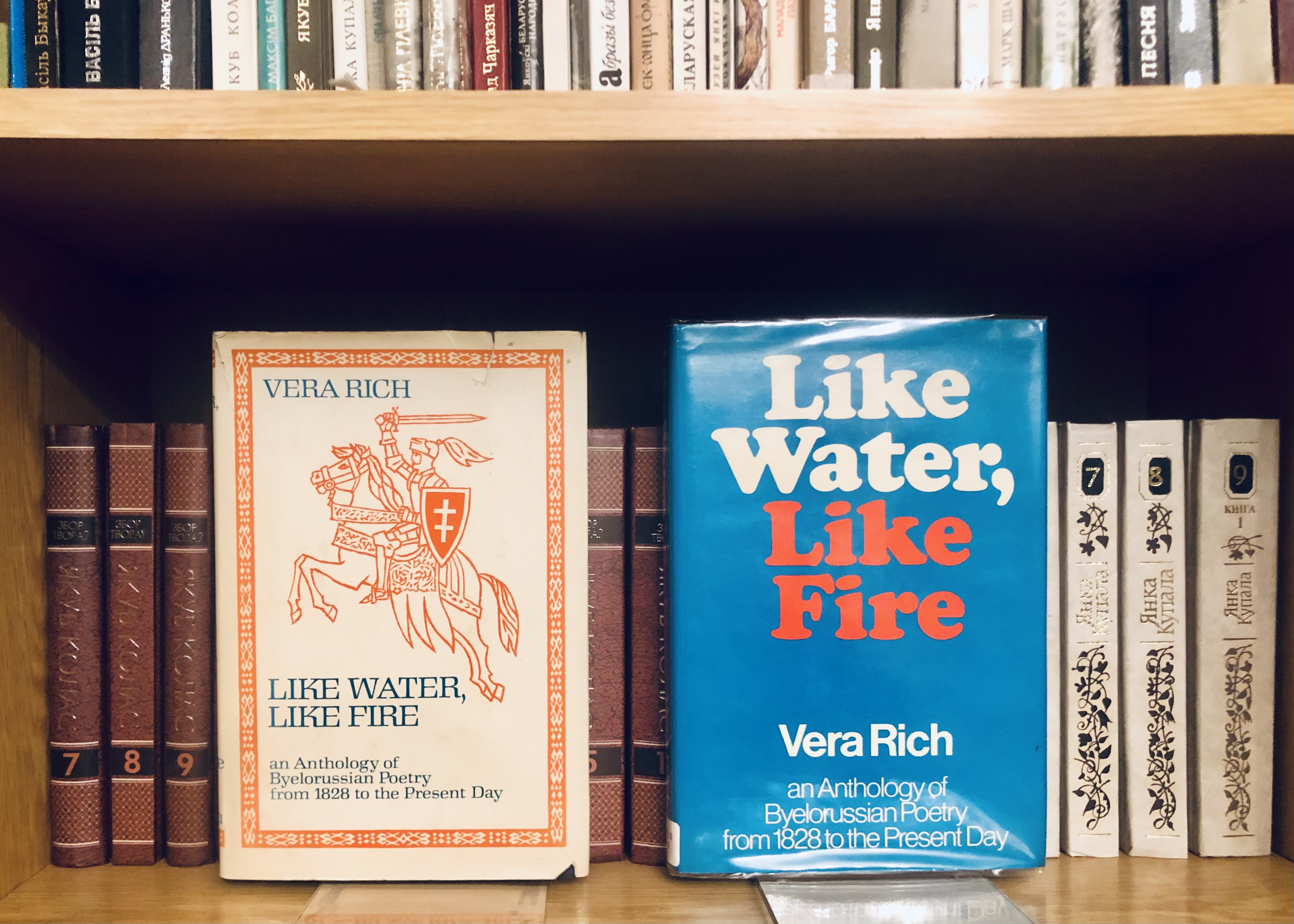
Two editions of Belarusian poetry Like Water, Like Fire in English

In 1965, The Journal of Belarusian Studies was created in London. The idea of an English-language academic journal in the field of Belarusian studies had been considered by the Anglo-Belarusian Society since its establishment in 1954, as the Society sought to disseminate information about Belarusians in the Western world. By 1965 the Society had found academics willing to contribute to such a journal as well as funding from the Belarusian Charitable Trust created under the auspices of the Association of Belarusians in Great Britain. The main persons behind the project were Guy Picarda and Auberon Herbert.

The first issue of the journal started with an introduction by Oxford professor Robert Auty about "a little-known East European people and its contribution to civilisation" and included articles by Alexander Nadson, Guy Picarda, Leo Haroška and Vera Rich as well as a book review and a chronicle of main events related to Belarus and the Belarusian communities abroad.

== In independent Belarus ==
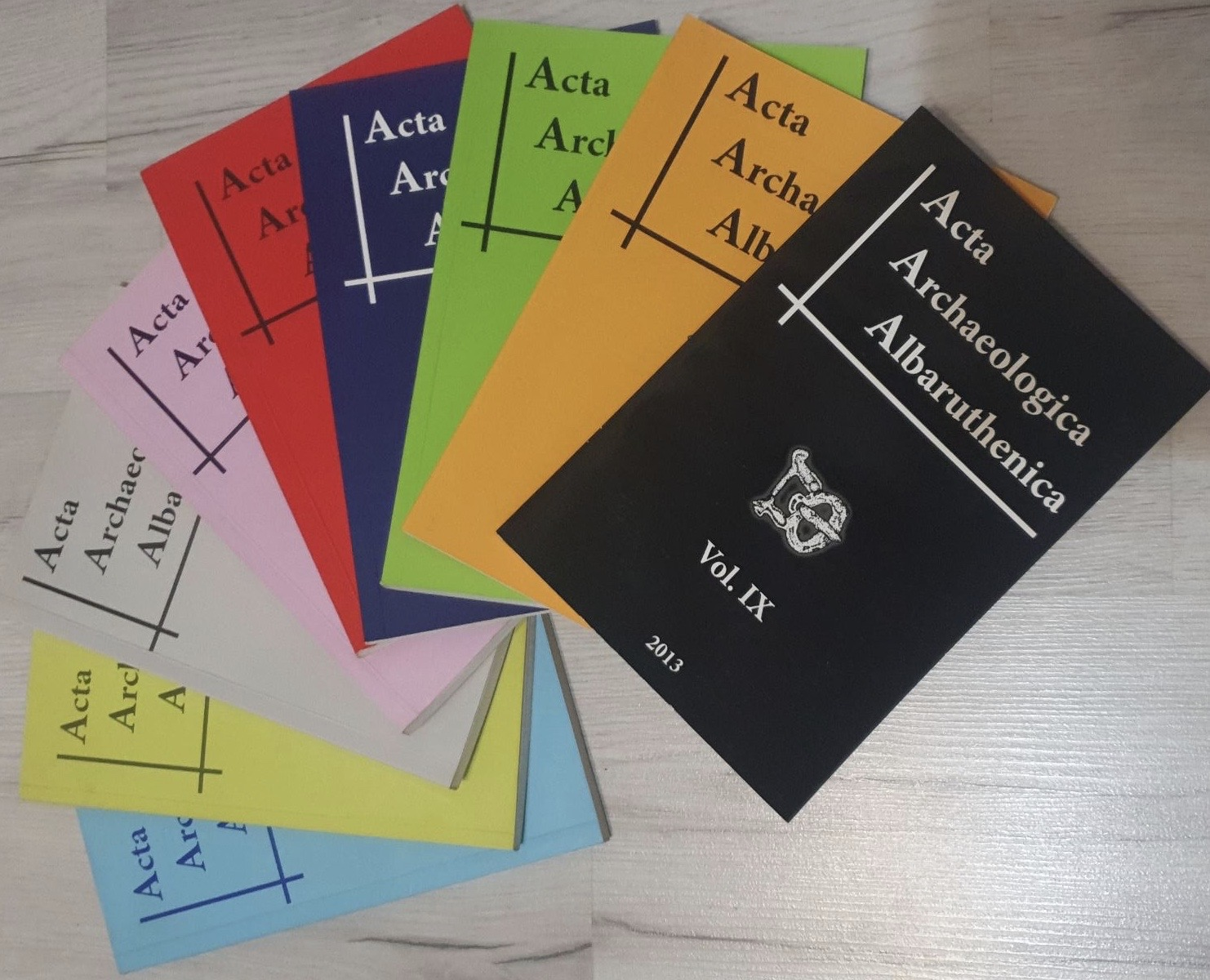
All issues of the short-lived journal Acta archaeologica Albaruthenica

After the dissolution of the Soviet Union and Belarusian independence, Belarusian studies became important in the new state. As Rainer Lindner wrote, "In 1991, national historiography attempted to provide the historical reasoning behind the Declaration of Independence, an event that was more of an accident than the result of internal democratization or a demand for sovereignty. By discovering, inventing, and rewriting national history, the new national historians became aware that Belarus lacked a "myth of the past" and indeed many of the attributes that one would normally find in a national history. This phenomenon has been fairly typical of many of the post-Soviet republics." He also noted that "The issue of the ethnic origins of the Belarusians has once again become, as during the 1920s, a historiographical question of faith." New themes in Belarusian studies include "Belarusians as 'the most pure' Slavic ethnos" moving toward a "Slavicized Balts than Balticized Slavs" narrative. The historiography of that period was called "neonational" and "romanticizing image of history".

Formerly, Ukraine and Belarus were marginal states in the declining empire with a history of statelessness and border readjustment. Now, as states with their own foreign policies, they have received visits from the American president and entered into alliances with Western European and international organizations. Therefore both social scientists and some political elite have been susceptible to geopolitical theories of the past and present.

Besides the new developments in the early 1990s, "[n]ational development was not only halted with the election of Alyaksandr Lukashenko as president, but the new government also soon readopted the former Soviet versions of the past." This period was deemed "neo-Soviet".
