= Radosław Kaleta =

Polish linguist and Belarusianist (born 1983)

- Born: Radosław Grzegorz Kaleta; 1983 (age 42–43); Warsaw, Poland
- Education: University of Warsaw
- Occupations: Linguist, Belarusianist, academic
- Employer: University of Warsaw
- Notable work: Błędologia w glottodydaktyce białorutenistycznej

Radosław Grzegorz Kaleta (born 1983) is a Polish linguist, Belarusianist, Polonist, and academic. He serves as a professor at the University of Warsaw, where he was the Head of the Department of Belarusian Studies (2019–2024) and is currently the Vice-Dean of the Faculty of Applied Linguistics. His research focuses on comparative linguistics, translation studies, glottodidactics (language education), and Polish-Belarusian language contacts.

== Early life and education ==
Kaleta was born in Warsaw in 1983. In his youth, he was active in social and student organizations and edited a school newspaper. In 2005, he completed a journalism internship at the Belarusian Service of Polish Radio.

He graduated from the University of Warsaw in 2007, earning a master's degree from the Faculty of Applied Linguistics and East Slavic Philologies. His master's thesis, written in the Belarusian language, compared the morphological features of the Taraškievica and Narkamaŭka spelling standards under the supervision of Nina Barszczewska. During this period, he completed pedagogical training at the Belarusian Lyceum in Hajnówka. In 2009, he obtained a second master's degree from the Faculty of Polish Studies at the University of Warsaw (Polonicum Centre), where he researched the teaching of Polish as a foreign language to Belarusians under the supervision of Piotr Garncarek.

== Academic career ==
In 2012, Kaleta earned his PhD in humanities (linguistics) from the University of Warsaw. His dissertation, titled Białorusko-polska homonimia międzyjęzykowa (Belarusian-Polish Interlanguage Homonymy), was supervised by Nina Barszczewska.

In 2019, he obtained his habilitation (doktor habilitowany) based on his work Błędologia w glottodydaktyce białorutenistycznej (Error Analysis in Belarusian Glottodidactics). This was the first monograph entirely dedicated to the study of Belarusian as a foreign language. In it, Kaleta popularized the term "Belarusian glottodidactics" and developed a theory of language errors naturally occurring among learners of Belarusian.

He was appointed as a university professor in 2021. Kaleta served as the Head of the Department of Belarusian Studies at the University of Warsaw from October 2019 to September 2024. In September 2024, he became the Vice-Dean of the Faculty of Applied Linguistics.

Kaleta is highly active in the structural development of Belarusian studies. In 2015, he initiated the establishment of the Laboratory of Belarusian Glottodidactics at the University of Warsaw. He is the founder and editor of the academic journal Беларуская мова як замежная (Belarusian Language as a Foreign Language), which has been published since 2017. He also served as the scientific secretary of the journal Acta Albaruthenica (2012–2015), its deputy editor-in-chief (2022–2024), and became its editor-in-chief in 2025.

He has completed internships and delivered guest lectures at various institutions, including the National Academy of Sciences of Belarus (2019), Minsk State Linguistic University (2017), and universities in Prague, Saint Petersburg, Slovakia, Romania, Germany, and China. He serves as an expert for the Polish Ministry of Education regarding general education textbooks for the Belarusian language.

== Social and educational activities ==
Following the repressions associated with the 2020 Belarusian presidential election, Kaleta initiated the "UW solidarny z Białorusią" (University of Warsaw in Solidarity with Belarus) campaign. Within this framework, he co-organized Polish language courses for Belarusian refugees in 2020–2021 under the patronage of the university's rector.

He has also translated poetry from Belarusian into Polish, including works by Maksim Bahdanovich ("I would like to meet you on the street") and Valyaryna Kustava ("My lips will grow numb — I will speak with my eyes...").

== Awards and honors ==
- Commemorative badge for the 90th anniversary of the Institute of Linguistics of the National Academy of Sciences of Belarus (October 14, 2019), awarded for his significant contribution to glottodidactics and the improvement of foreign language teaching methods.
- Rector of the University of Warsaw Award (2016, 2020, 2023).

== Selected works ==
=== Monographs ===
- Kaleta, R. (2014). Białorusko-polska homonimia międzyjęzykowa [Belarusian-Polish Interlanguage Homonymy] (in Polish). Warszawa.
- Kaleta, R. (2015). Polsko-białoruska lapsologia glottodydaktyczna [Polish-Belarusian Glottodidactic Lapsology] (in Polish). Warszawa.
- Kaleta, R. (2018). Błędologia w glottodydaktyce białorutenistycznej [Error Analysis in Belarusian Glottodidactics] (in Polish). Warszawa.
- Калета, Р. (2021). Папулярная беларуская граматыка для іншаземцаў [Popular Belarusian Grammar for Foreigners] (in Belarusian). Warszawa.

=== Edited volumes ===
- Kaleta, R., ed. (2017). Białoruś w dyskursie naukowym. Lingwistyka, socjologia, politologia [Belarus in Scientific Discourse. Linguistics, Sociology, Political Science] (in Polish). Warszawa.
- Kaleta, R., ed. (2020). Język, literatura i kultura Białorusi na przestrzeni wieków [Language, Literature, and Culture of Belarus Over the Centuries] (in Polish). Warszawa.
- Kaleta, R., ed. (2023). Спазнаючы Беларусь… Да 65-годдзя беларусістыкі Варшаўскага ўніверсітэта [Discovering Belarus... On the Occasion of the 65th Anniversary of Belarusian Studies at the University of Warsaw] (in Belarusian). Warszawa: Wydawnictwa Uniwersytetu Warszawskiego.
