= Peter John Mayo =

English Slavist researcher

- Born: 16 February 1944; London, UK
- Died: April 2004 (aged 60)
- Education: University of Birmingham
- Occupation: English Slavist
- Employer(s): University of Sheffield, University of Exeter
- Notable work: Pocket English-Belarusian-Russian Dictionary

Peter John Mayo (16 February 1944 in London – 1 January 2004) was an English slavist and promoter of Belarusian studies in Great Britain.

== Career ==
Mayo was born in London. He graduated from the University of Birmingham in 1966.

From 1969 to 1997 he worked as a lecturer at the University of Sheffield, and since 1998 at the University of Exeter. He was a member of the British University Association of Slavists (in 1978-80 its secretary).

In 1982 Mayo earned a PhD in philology.

== Belarusian studies ==
Mayo studied the lexicography, morphology and syntax of the Belarusian and Russian languages. He authored "Grammar of the Byelorussian" reviewed in the Journal of Belarusian Studies by Shirin Akiner as well as section "Belarusian language" in the collective monograph "Slavic languages", numerous articles on Belarusian and Slavic studies. He also wrote reviews of Belarusian linguistic research, textbooks and dictionaries.

In 1979-88 Mayo was the editor of the Journal of Byelorussian Studies, and from 1989 of the Slavic Section of “Modern Languages Studies”. He prepared an English-Belarusian dictionary, a version of which was published in Minsk in 1995 as "Pocket English-Belarusian-Russian Dictionary". Mayo was one of the editors of English-Belarusian Dictionary published in 2013.

Mayo was a longtime member of the Anglo-Belarusian Society and a trustee of the Francis Skaryna Belarusian Library and Museum in London.

== Death ==
Mayo died in April 2004. The University of Sheffield prize for Russian was renamed in his honour.
