= The Journal of Belarusian Studies =

Journal of Belarusian Studies
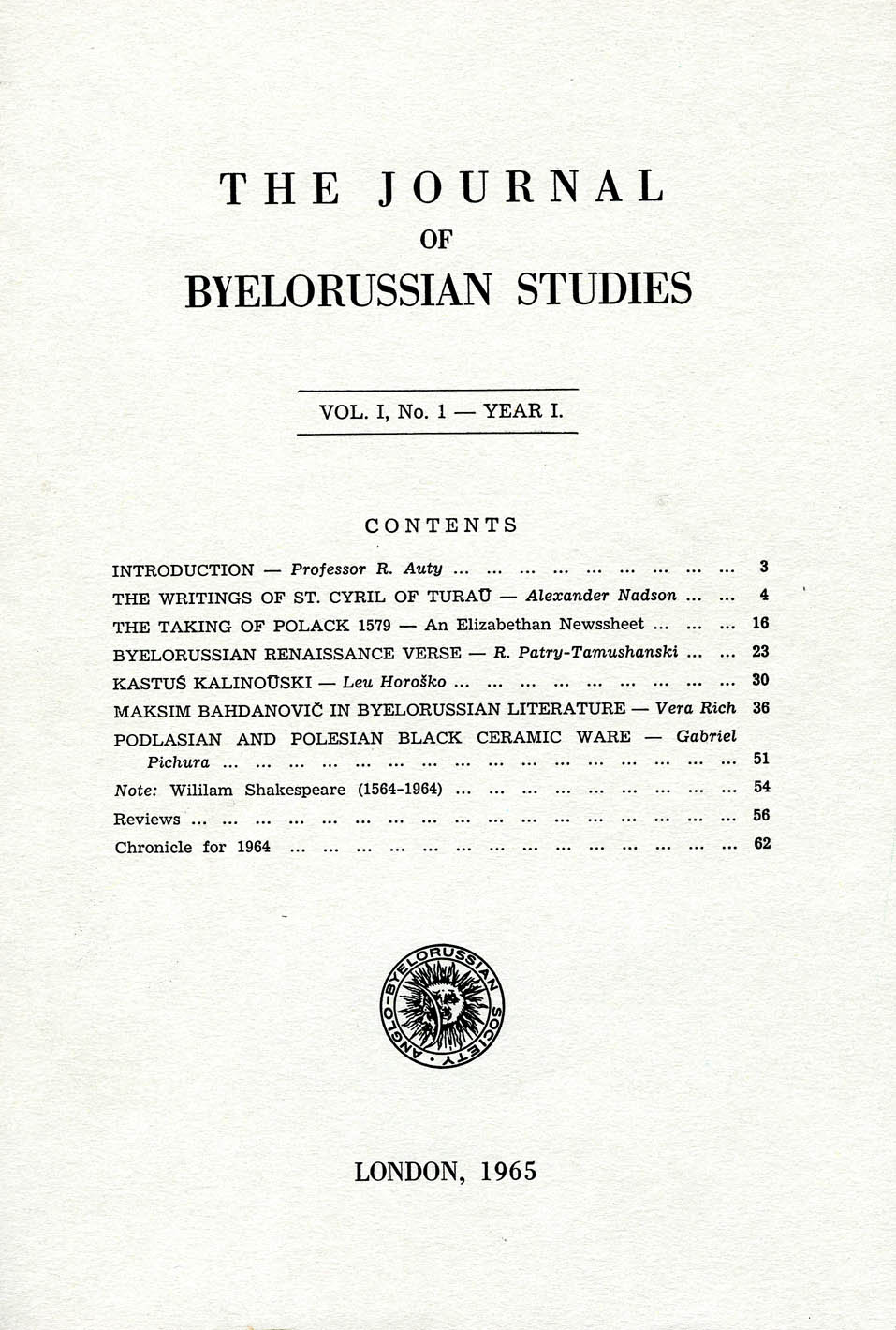
- Cover page of the first issue (1965)
- Discipline: Belarusian studies
- Language: English
- Edited by: Yaraslau Kryvoi

Publication details
- Former name: Journal of Byelorussian Studies
- History: 1965–88, 2013–present
- Publisher: Anglo-Belarusian Society (1965-88), Brill (2013-present) (UK)
- Frequency: Biannual
- Open access: Hybrid

Standard abbreviations
- ISO 4: J. Belarusian Stud.

Indexing
- ISSN: 0075-4161

Links
- Journal homepage; Latest articles; Archive

The Journal of Belarusian Studies (formerly the Journal of Byelorussian Studies) is an English language academic journal in the field of Belarusian studies. It was described as “one of the longest lasting Belarusian publishing projects in Great Britain and one of the most authoritative periodicals in the field of Belarusian studies in the world”.

== 1965 to 1988 ==
The idea of an English-language academic journal in the field of Belarusian studies had been considered by the Anglo-Belarusian Society since its establishment in 1954, as the Society sought to disseminate information about Belarusians in the Western world. By 1965 the Society had found academics willing to contribute to such a journal as well as funding from the Belarusian Charitable Trust created under the auspices of the Association of Belarusians in Great Britain. The main persons behind the project were Guy Picarda and Auberon Herbert.

The first issue of the journal started with an introduction by Oxford professor Robert Auty about "a little-known East European people and its contribution to civilisation" and included articles by Alexander Nadson, Guy Picarda, Leo Haroška and Vera Rich as well as a book review and a chronicle of main events related to Belarus and the Belarusian communities abroad.

Subsequent 20 issues published between 1966 and 1988 followed a similar format and included articles by Arnold McMillin, Jim Dingley, Shirin Akiner and many others. The topics covered by the journal included the Belarusian language and literature as well as the history and geography of Belarus. A number of English translations of Belarusian literature and poetry were published, including poems by Jan Czeczot. The editors of the journal deliberately avoided coverage of current affairs - to ensure that it focused on academic studies without a political context.

The circulation of each issue was between 500 and 800 copies, which were sent to many universities and libraries in Britain and abroad (including the Soviet Union). The main editors of the journal in the 20th century were Arnold McMillin (1967–1971), Jim Dingley (1972–1980) and Peter John Mayo (1980–1988).

The production of the "old" journal ceased in 1988, although in 1997 Guy Picarda resumed the publication of a periodic chronicle of Belarusian events with occasional articles in the field of Belarusian studies under the guise of Belarusian Chronicle. That periodical, regarded as having a significant information value, albeit inferior to its predecessor from an academic perspective, was published for approximately 10 years until Guy Picarda's death.

== 2013 to present day ==
The journal was relaunched in May 2013 after a 25 years’ break by a working group which included those who were involved with the journal in the past and a new generation of Belarusian scholars with an ambition to become a platform for Belarusian and Western academics to share their ideas. Yaraslau Kryvoi became the editor of the relaunched journal.

Apart from covering a range of academic topic in Belarusian studies, in line with the tradition, the relaunched journal also includes a chronicle of current events of the Anglo-Belarusian Society, as well as sections reviewing books and Internet resources, “which underlines its academic component”.

Unlike the older version, the renewed journal has a wider coverage of academic subjects, does not avoid current affairs and features articles on social and political topics. The first relaunched issue had an article by Andrej Kotljarchuk on memory politics in Belarus, David Marples on foreign policy of Belarus and Arnold McMillin on the poetry of Belarusian prisoners.

Most of the contributors to the journal are Belarusian, British and German academics followed by authors from Poland, Czech Republic, Sweden, Canada, the United States, Hungary and Russia.

The Journal is currently published by the Ostrogroski Centre jointly with Brill Publishers. In 2013 and 2014, two issues of the journal were also published in the Belarusian language.

The journal is distributed annually to universities, libraries and private subscribers in the UK, the US, Belarus and other countries throughout the world.
