= Guy Picarda =

British scholar (1931-2007)

Guy Reginald Pierre Picarda (20 July 1931 – 20 April 2007) was a scholar and promoter of Belarusian culture and music, a founder of the Anglo-Belarusian Society and the Journal of Belarusian Studies.

== Biography ==
=== Early life and heritage ===
Picarda was born in 1931 in North London to parents of French-Breton and Anglo-Irish background. His father was avocat at the Court of Appeal in Paris and a Barrister of the Middle Temple in London. His mother served in the 1920s on the Interallied Rhineland High Commission.

He was educated at various schools and at Grenoble University, Queen's College, Oxford, and the London School of Economics. This was followed by pupillages in London and Paris. He first became interested in Slavonic church music as a student, singing in the Orthodox cathedral choir in Paris.

=== Promoter of Belarusian culture ===
In the 1950s, Picarda establishes close links with the Belarusian community in London.

In 1954 he became a founding member of the Anglo-Belarusian Society, which was created with the object of the diffusion, interchange and publication of knowledge relating to the Belarusian people, their land, their history and their culture. Among the early cultural activities of the Society was the publication of a pamphlet on Belarus (1954) and the organisation of two concerts of Belarusian church chants, folk songs and dances in Westminster Cathedral Hall (1954 and 1956). For many years Picarda was the chairman of the Society.

In 1965 Picarda was one of the founders of the Journal of Belarusian Studies, the oldest English language periodical on Belarusian studies which continues to the present day. The Journal was distributed annually to universities, libraries and private subscribers in the UK, the US, Soviet Belarus and other countries throughout the world. As well as articles on Belarusian literature, linguistics, history and art, each number of the Journal included book reviews, a chronicle of current events, and a comprehensive bibliography for the preceding year.

=== Scholar and arranger of Belarusian music ===
Picarda’s main scholarly passion was Belarusian church and folk music. He compiled a sizeable collection of printed Belarusian music and produced work on neglected hymns and as well as own musical arrangements.

Picarda established connections with choirs all over Belarus, maintained regular private correspondence with such figures in the Belarusian music world as Viktar Skorabahataŭ and Anatol Bahatyroŭ and for many years was a judge at a festival of ecclesiastical music in Mahilioŭ “Almighty God” (“Магутны Божа”).

=== Other scholarly interests ===
Apart from Belarusian music, Picarda’s academic publications explore Anglo-Belarusian relations and cover a wide range of interests.

The early articles he wrote under the pseudonym Haŭryil Pičura for the journal “On God’s Way”(Божым Шляхам) deal with such disparate topics as the mysterious fifteenth-century printer who worked for a time in London, called in English ‘John of Lettow’ (Ян з Літвы), and the monetary system of the Grand Duchy of Lithuania. In the Journal of Belarusian Studies, he wrote articles ranging from Francis Skaryna’s engravings to a possible connection between Skaryna and the Jewish mystical tradition known as kabbalah.

Picarda was the author of “Minsk: A Historical Guide (first published 1994)”, the first English language historical-tourist guide to the capital of Belarus.

=== Death ===
Picarda died in London on 20 April 2007. His ashes are kept at the Catholic Church of Saints Simon and Helena on the main square in Minsk
