= Like Water, Like Fire =

Poetry

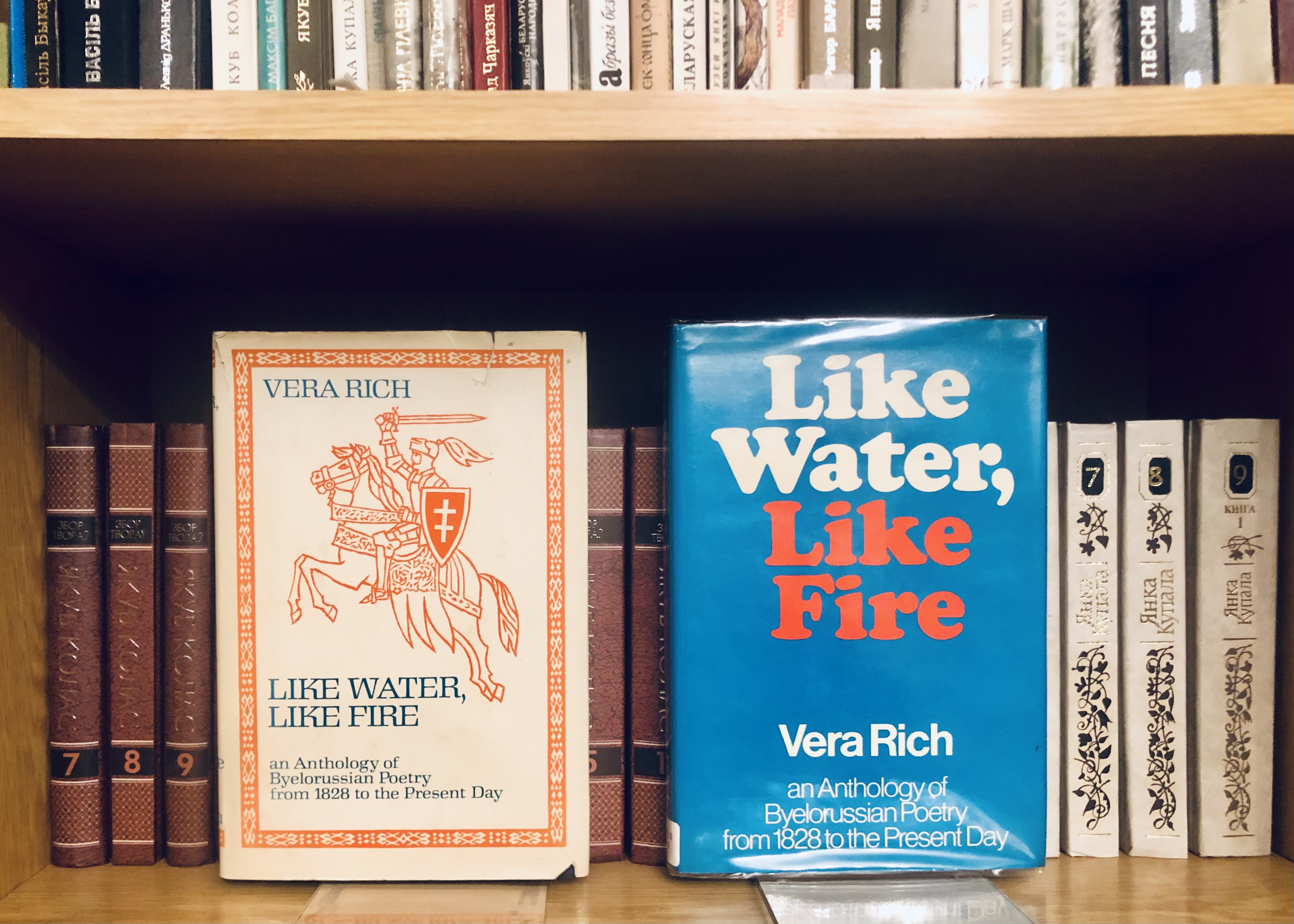
- Both editions at the Francis Skaryna Belarusian Library and Museum
- Author: Vera Rich
- Series: UNESCO Collection of Representative Works
- Genre: Poetry
- Published: 1971 (George Allen & Unwin)
- Pages: 347
- ISBN: 0-04-891041-4

Like Water, like Fire: an Anthology of Byelorussian Poetry from 1828 to the Present Day was the first and still the most comprehensive anthology of Belarusian poetry in English translation. It was published in London in the UNESCO Collection of Representative Works series in 1971. The translator of all works was London-based journalist, poet and translator Vera Rich. The book was jointly funded by UNESCO and the National Commission for UNESCO of the Byelorussian SSR.

== Content ==
The book's title comes from Janka Kupała's poem In the Night Pasture (Belarusian: На папасе, romanized: Na papasie):

by forces unknown / New-created, like water, like fire!

The book consists of 221 poems and poetry fragments by 41 authors — 37 men, four women — across 347 pages.

It begins with the only known poem by Paŭliuk Bahrym, ‘Play Then, Play’, which was taught in the schools of Soviet Belarus as the earliest example of peasants’ liberation literature. It continues with works by Francišak Bahuševič and Janka Łučyna from the mid-19th century and ends with the Soviet Belarusian authors Maksim Tank and Arkadź Kulašoŭ.

The book begins with acknowledgements and a 10-page introduction, in which the translator discusses the historical context of the published works and of Belarusian literature as a whole. The translator also explains the pronunciation of the names and transliterated words of Belarusian origin, for which she uses a Belarusian Latin alphabet.

The anthology is divided into seven chronological parts. Each part begins with a short introduction to the corresponding literary period and ends with the translator's detailed commentaries to the published works.

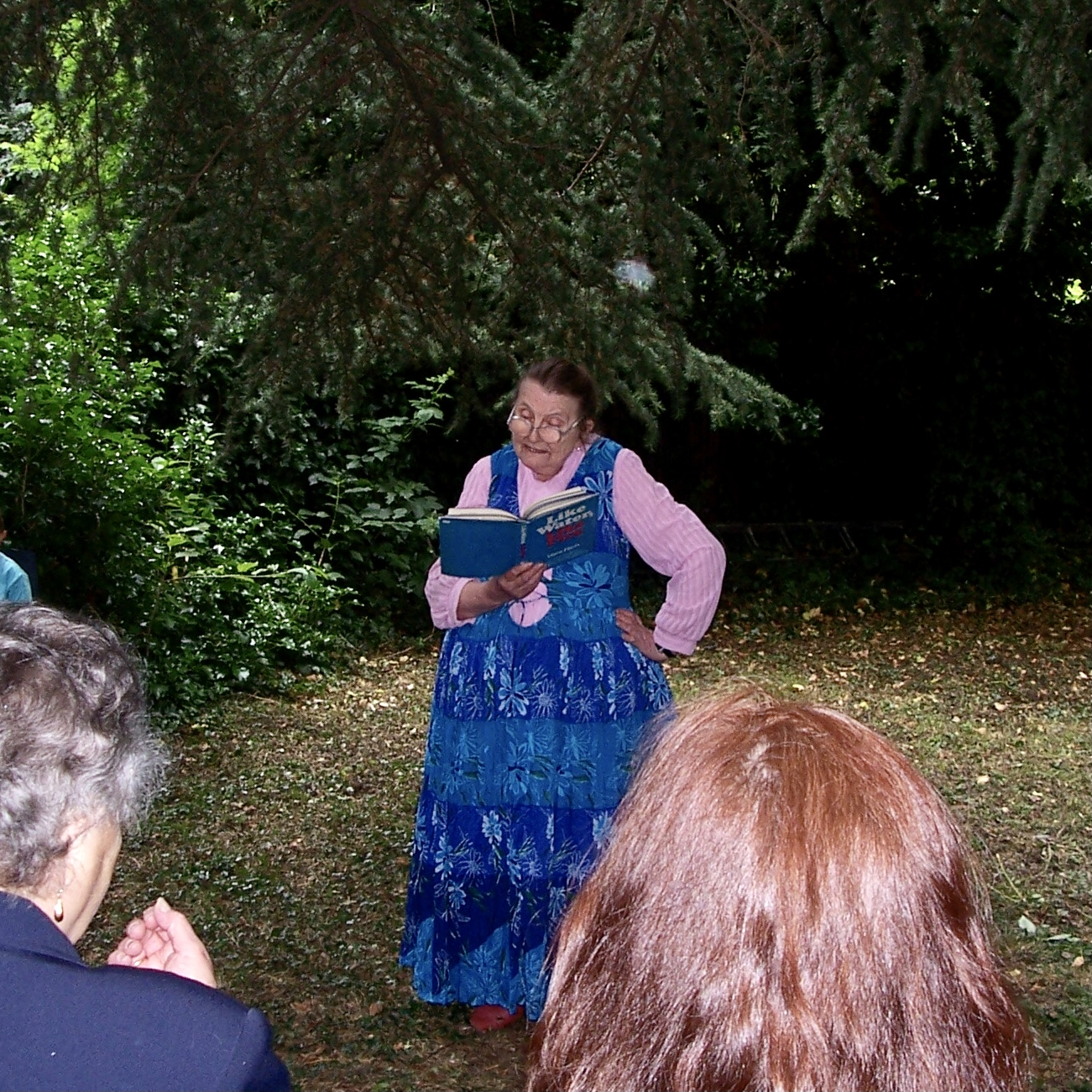
Vera Rich reading from Like Water, Like Fire during the Kupalle (Belarusian Midsummer Night) celebration in London, 2009

== Analysis ==
The Belarusian diaspora and specialists in Belarusian studies welcomed the anthology and recommended it to their readers. They also criticized its shortcomings.

Janka Zaprudnik, a Belarusian scholar based in the United States, wrote that the Soviet co-funder insisted on populating the anthology with a significant number of authors who "though were not of a great talent, had the impeccable party reputation".

Alexander Nadson, head of the Belarusian Catholic community in London, who knew Rich for many years and assisted her with translations, recalled that the translator kept the exact content of the anthology secret, alluding this was due to a possible influence of one of the book's funders. He noted that Rich was most productive under pressure which might explain the varied quality of translations. In a short critical article he quoted Nił Hilevič's A Wonder Came (Belarusian: Цуд тварыўся) as an example of a successful translation. He also regretted that a significant number of works selected for the anthology were of poor quality. He predicted the next chance for such a publication wouldn't happen soon.

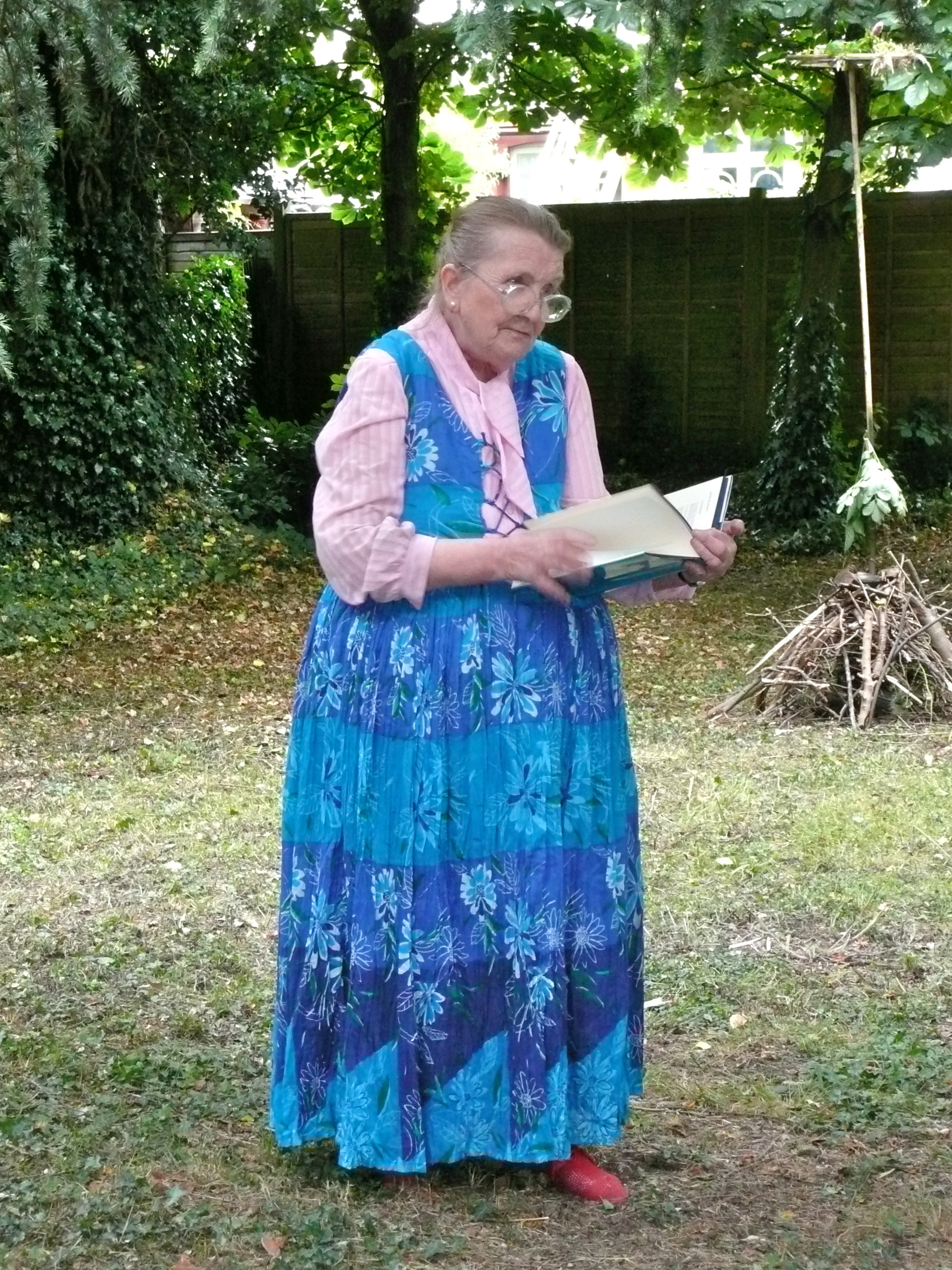
Vera Rich, the author and translator of the Like Water, Like Fire anthology, 2009

Arnold McMillin welcomed Like Water, Like Fire as "an outstanding piece of work which will serve many English readers as an introduction to an unjustly neglected corner of European literature". He was critical, however, of a misrepresentative – to a certain degree – selection of works: poor representation of the 19th century poetry and emphasis on poetry of the last 30 years (that is, 1940s-60s) which — he speculated — might have been the result of the sponsors' influence. In his opinion, the translator was most successful with the works of the beginning of the 20th century and the Naša Niva period of Belarusian literature, particularly poems by Bujła, Kupała, Kołas and Bahdanovič.

Anton Adamovič of the Belarusian Institute of Arts and Sciences in New York, corroborated McMillin's criticism. He noted that contemporary (that is, post-World War II) Soviet Belarusian poetry was represented most extensively: 29 out of 41 authors of the anthology were living at the time of the publication; 165 out of 221 poems were composed and published in Soviet Belarus. Most of those works were also translated well, "particularly the poems by Tank, Kulašoŭ, Pančanka, Pysin, Baradulin, and Hilevič". However, the 1920s - one of the most fruitful periods for the Belarusian literature and culture - was represented by only one poem. The whole of pre-Soviet Belarusian poetry was represented by 56 poems of nine authors. None of the poets of the post-Second World War Belarusian diaspora were included. Adamovič admitted that the book had "many apt observations and comments in the introduction and in the numerous notes", however it contained "just as many misunderstandings and factual errors". This led him to suggest that while the book would be useful and enjoyable for general readers, "journalists and scholars [...] should be cautious when using the anthology for quotations and comments."

Thirty years after the anthology's appearance, a US-based scholar, Lavon Jurevič, wrote that the anthology "is a unique edition even today; it is indeed the only one of its kind in a positive sense, because of its quality and coverage, but also in a negative sense, it being the only one".

In 2012, Svetlana Skomorokhova produced a detailed analysis of the anthology as part of her doctoral thesis on the English translation of Belarusian literature. She noted that 'the founding fathers' of the new Belarusian literature - Bahdanovich, Kolas and Kupala - were the most translated poets of the anthology; and the well-established poets of the 20th century were well represented too, which "makes the book a seminal work in Belarusian literary translations into English". Its "scope and diachronic method make it as yet unrivalled", while "the coverage and the encyclopaedic character of the data presented in the book are extensive". Skomorokhova noted that for translating and explaining Belarusian poetry, Vera Rich used masterfully her knowledge of classical English literature, and employed comparisons with English, Irish and Welsh literary traditions extensively. Skomorokhova doubted, however, that Rich's style would appeal to a modern reader; she suggested that Rich's translations "may be in line for further revisions as well due to her disregard of contemporary literary aesthetics in her translations".

== Curious facts ==
=== Acknowledgements ===
The one page and half of the Acknowledgements section reads like a piece of smart comedy. It begins with acknowledging 13 libraries and research institutions which assisted Vera Rich with "help and advice": mostly libraries in Britain (incl. the Belarusian Library in London), as well as in Norway and Denmark. Then she thanks "the Royal Horticultural Gardens, Kew for checking so many details of the flora of Byelorussia, H.M. War Office, for advice on the management and control of tanks, and British Rail [...], for details of the logistics of rolling stock". Among the named individuals there was Olwen Way, "who supplied some Welsh parallels, and also advised on certain matters connected with horse-riding", and Patricia Waller, "for her technical knowledge and advice concerning the curing of pork both now and in the past".

A paragraph of the Acknowledgements is dedicated to the members of the Belarusian community in London, incl. "Bishop Česlaǔ Sipovič, for his valuable advice on all Church matters"; Rev. Alexander Nadson, "for supplying much of the bibliographical detail"; Rich's tutors in Belarusian, Dominik Aniśka and "Leǔ Haroška, whom for so long I drove to distraction with my inability to master the pronunciation of the hard 'ł'". The only person from the Soviet Belarus mentioned in the Acknowledgements was Jazep Siemiažon, a translator who Rich had never met, "for his suggested list of inclusions".

At the end of the section Rich explains that the work on the anthology spread over 18 years. It made many people weary of the translator's problems related to the book. The final gratitude is addressed to "the Enfield Fire Service who salvaged the manuscript during a flood-cum-electrical-fire shortly before its completion".

=== Dustjackets ===
The book appeared with two different dust jackets. One featured an oak leaf while the other featured a historical coat of arms, the Pahonia. Its designer's name is mentioned in the book: Stewart Irwin.

According to Janka Zaprudnik, the National Commission for UNESCO of the Byelorussian SSR strongly objected to the dust jacket carrying the Pahonia; after the book went on sale the BSSR party demanded the whole stock to be destroyed, however UNESCO refused as this would have constituted a breach of the contract with the publisher. Eventually, UNESCO agreed to pay for replacing the dust jacket for the one with the oak leaf. Other Byelorussian demands - removal of the note mentioning the joint publication of the book, removal of the copyright notice and adding a disclaimer of Vera Rich's full responsibility for the introduction and commentaries — were not met.

The reprinted dust jacket had neither the Pahonia nor an oak leaf; it was plain sky-blue with bold lettering. The price went up from £4.50 to £4.95. Both editions — at variance with the established bibliographical practice — carried the same ISBN, which makes finding the copies with the original dustjacket more difficult.
