= Shirin Akiner =

British historian (1943–2019)

Shirin Akiner Mitchell
- Born: 16 June 1943; Dacca, British India
- Died: 6 April 2019 (aged 75)
- Occupations: Historian; literature scholar

Academic background
- Education: London University

Academic work
- Institutions: School of Oriental and African Studies
- Main interests: Central Asia and Belarus
- Notable works: Religious Language of a Belarusian Tatar Kitab: A Cultural Monument of Islam in Europe

Shirin Akiner (16 June 1943 – 6 April 2019) was a scholar of Central Asia and Belarus. She was a research associate at London University's School of Oriental and African Studies (SOAS).

== Life ==
Shirin Akiner was born in 1943 in Dacca, British India. She studied at London University, gaining her first degree in Slavonic philology, and Turkish language and literature (Ottoman and modern). She gained her doctorate in 1980 from University College London as a researcher of the heritage of the Belarusian Lipka Tatars, with her dissertation titled "The religious vocabulary of the British Library Tatar-Byelorussian Kitab".

Her first husband was killed in a car crash just before the birth of their son Metin. In 1973, she remarried.

Akiner produced many scholarly works, particularly on Uzbekistan and Kazakhstan. She was a member of the editorial and advisory board of the Journal of Central Asian and Caucasian Studies, published by the U.S.A.K., and a chair of the British-Uzbek Society.

She was also a researcher of modern Belarusian literature, including the literature of the Belarusian minority in Poland. She published articles in the Journal of Belarusian Studies and maintained active contacts with the Belarusian community in Britain, including Alexander Nadson. In 1984, she published a book of English translations of miniature works by the Belarusian writer from Poland Sokrat Janowicz.

In 2005, human rights groups, non-governmental organizations, and the former British ambassador to Uzbekistan Craig Murray, accused her of producing a biased and "propagandist" report on the Andijan massacre in Uzbekistan. Murray called on Colin Bundy, the director of SOAS, to take action against Akiner for allegedly promoting falsehoods, but the latter refused on the grounds that Murray's views were "unsubstantiated".

Akiner died on 6 April 2019.

== Selected publications ==
- Religious Language of a Belarusian Tatar Kitab: A Cultural Monument of Islam in Europe, 457 pp. Wiesbaden: Harrassowitz Verlag, 2009
- Violence in Andijan, 13 May 2005: An Independent Assessment, 51pp. Johns Hopkins University, Uppsala University (Sweden), 2005. ISBN 91-85031-08-9.
- The Caspian: Politics, Energy, Security, 405pp. RoutledgeCurzon (UK), 2004. ISBN 0-7007-0501-5.
- Tajikistan: Disintegration or Reconciliation?, 95pp. Royal Institute of International Affairs (London), 2001. ISBN 1-86203-061-8.
- The Formation of Kazakh Identity; from Tribe to Nation-State, 83pp. Royal Institute of International Affairs, 1995. ISBN 1-899658-03-3.
- Resistance and Reform in Tibet edited by Robert Barnett and Shirin Akiner : C.Hurst 1994, Indiana University Press.
- Islamic Peoples of the Soviet Union, 476pp. Routledge, 1987. ISBN 9781136142741.
