= Karuś Kahaniec =

Belarusian poet, writer, and revolutionary (1868–1918)

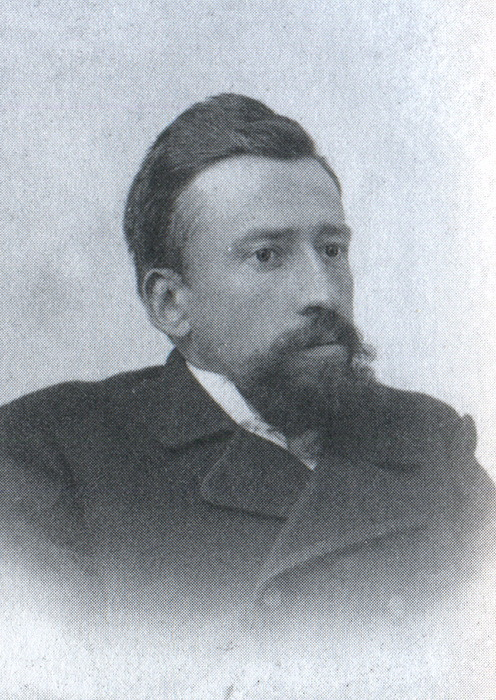
Karuś Kahaniec

Karuś Kahaniec (born Kasimir-Rafail Kastrawitski; 1868–1918) was a Belarusian poet and writer.

== Biography ==
Kasimir-Rafail Kastrawitski's parents, Karl Samuilovitsch Kastrawitski and Elena Tadeuschewna Kastrawitska, came from wealthy aristocratic families. His mother Elena received her education in Vilnius and when she was 19 she married Karl Kastrawitski, who was twenty-one years her senior. He and many close relatives took an active part in the January uprising of Kastuś Kalinoŭski (1863–1864) and were exiled with their families to Siberia after the uprising was crushed. Kastrawitsky came to Tobolsk, where their son Kasimir was born in 1868. He spent the first six years of his life in exile in Tobolsk until the family was allowed to return to Belarus in 1874. The family settled in the village of Zasulje, where Kasimir's father died at the age of 60, leaving his wife and four children. From the age of 6 Kasimir was already working as a shepherd and spending a lot of time outdoors, which later inspired him to describe the beauty of the Belarusian landscape. The family lived in poor conditions and Kasimir's mother married a second time. After moving to Prymagille, where the mother got back her non-confiscated land, the family lived well again, even had servants and a bakery.

Karus first received his education in a municipal school in Minsk, later he studied at the Moscow Academy of Painting, Sculpture and Architecture. In 1893 he began his literary work and published his own works in various magazines.

== Career ==
In the years 1890 to 1900 Karuś Kahaniec published his adaptations of folk tales in the newspapers "Minskij Listok" and "Severo-Zapadnyj Kraj". In 1902, together with Anton and Ivan Luzkevich, Aleksandr Burbis, Eloisa Pashkevich and others, he founded the Belarusian Revolutionary Party, which in 1903 changed its name to the Belarusian Socialist Assembly (Biełaruskaja sacyjalistyčnaja hramada). In 1904, Kahanez founded the "Polesje" newspaper. In 1905 he took part in the first farmers' conference in Belarus.

In 1905, after organizing a rally, Kahaniec was arrested and had to serve his first prison sentence in Minsk until May 1906. In the same year the first legal Belarusian publishing house, The Sun Will Look Into Our Window, was established. Kahaniec wrote one of the first textbooks of Belarusian language, printed in 1906. He also worked with Nasha Niva newspaper.
