= Vera Rich =

British poet, journalist, historian, and translator

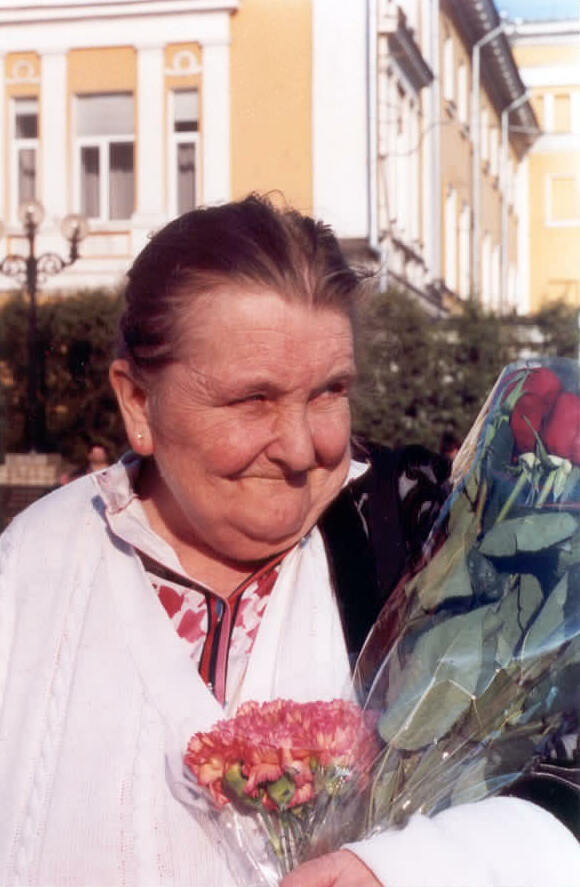
- Vera Rich in 2006
- Born: Faith Elizabeth Joan Rich; 24 April 1936; London, England
- Died: 20 December 2009 (aged 73); London, England
- Citizenship: United Kingdom
- Education: St Hilda's College, Oxford, Bedford College, London
- Occupations: poet, historian, translator, journalist, contributor to Nature, The Lancet, Index on Censorship, Physics World

Vera Rich (born Faith Elizabeth Joan Rich, 24 April 1936 – 20 December 2009) was a British poet, journalist, historian, and translator from Belarusian and Ukrainian.

== Biography ==
Born in London in April 1936, she studied at St Hilda's College of the University of Oxford and Bedford College, London. In 1959, her poetry attracted the attention of the editors of John O'London's Weekly and the following year her first collection of verse, Outlines, was privately produced and received favourable reviews, selling out within six months.

Her translations of the works of Taras Shevchenko, commissioned for the century of his death (1961), received favourable reviews, both in the West and in Soviet Ukraine. For this work, Rich was awarded an Honorary Diploma in Shevchenko Studies by the Ukrainian Free Academy of Sciences.

Later, influenced by Fr Ceslaus Sipovich, she started also translating Belarusian poetry. Her first translation from Belarusian was the poem "Na čužynie" by Janka Kupała. Her translated collection Like Water, Like Fire, published in 1971, was the world's first anthology of translations of Belarusian poetry into a western European language. Later she published The Images Swarm Free, a collection of translations of verses by prominent Belarusian authors, including Alés Harun, Maksim Bahdanovič and Źmitrok Biadula. Rich inspired a number of other British people such as Alan Flowers to become involved in promotion of Belarusian culture.

Rich was the founder of Manifold, "the magazine of new poetry". It was started in 1962 and appeared regularly under her editorship until May 1969, when it was suspended owing to her taking a job as Soviet and East European Correspondent for the scientific weekly Nature. At the time of its suspension Manifold had close on 900 subscribers, almost half of them in the USA. This initially temporary job at Nature lasted for more than 20 years. It was only in 1998 that it proved possible to relaunch Manifold. All together, 49 issues were published under Rich's editorship. It published original poetry in traditional and innovative styles, in various variants of English, and – from time to time – in major European languages, as well as translations of poetry from less-known languages.

== Personal life ==
Vera Rich married George Orchard in London in 1957.

She died in London in December 2009. Her ashes were buried in Ukraine and in the Church of St Cyril of Turau and All the Patron Saints of the Belarusian People in London.

== Gallery ==
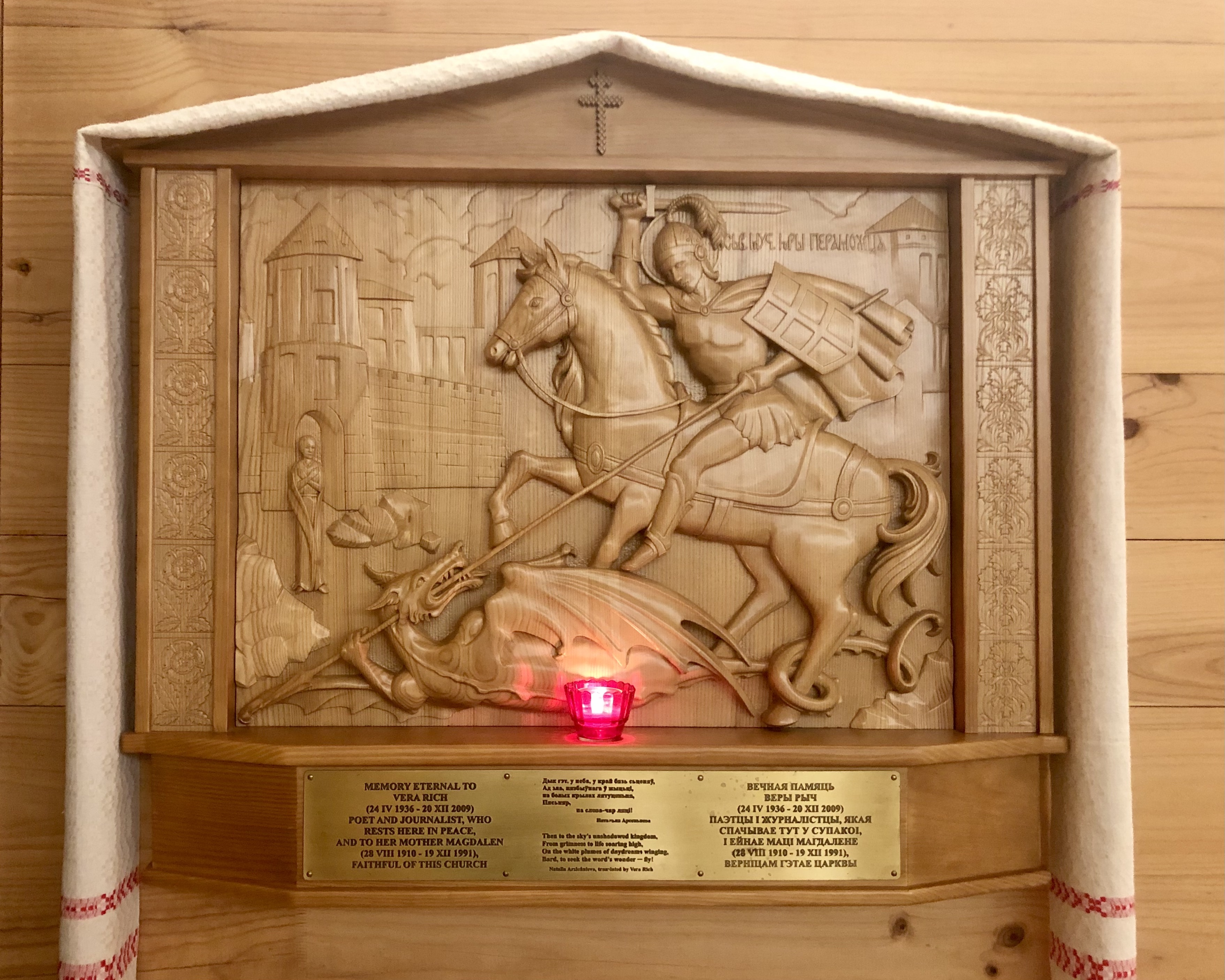
A memorial plaque in the Church of St Cyril of Turau and All the Patron Saints of the Belarusian People in London.

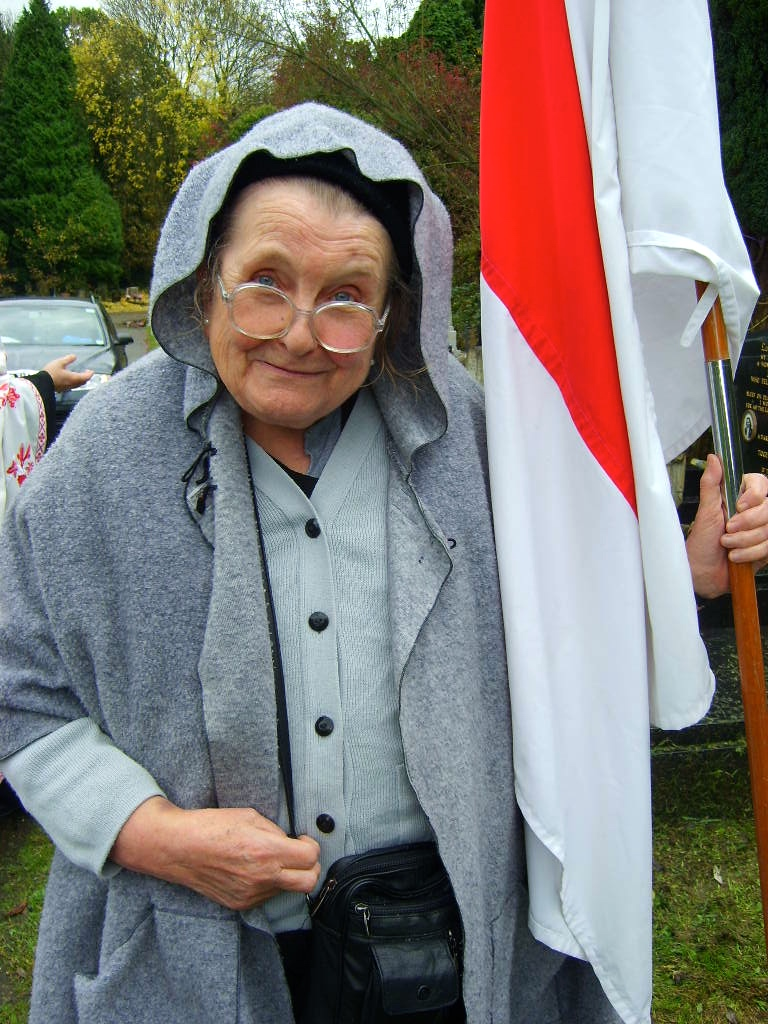
On St Pancras cemetery in London, 2008

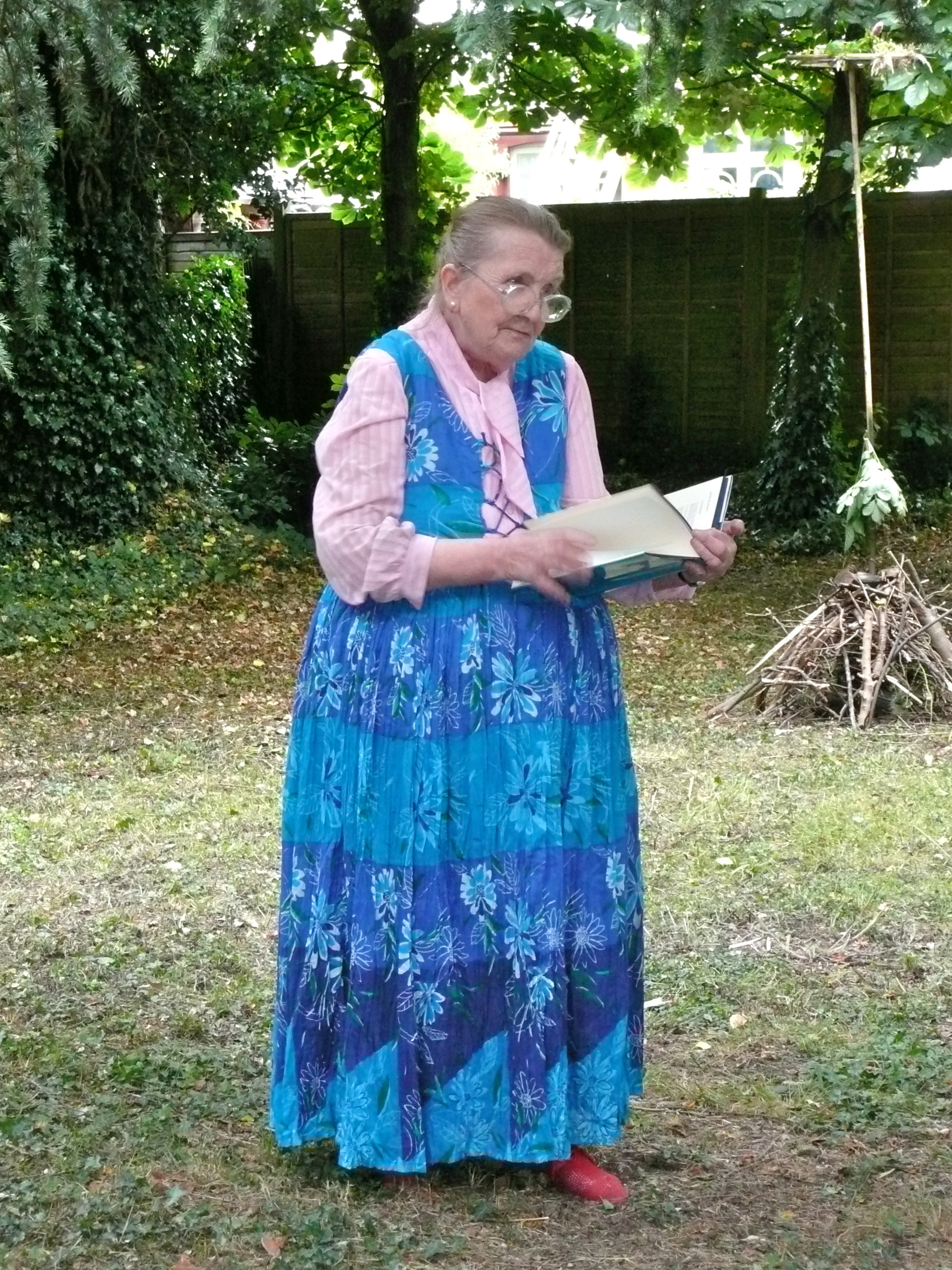
Reading from the Like Water, Like Fire at the Kupala celebration in London, 2009

== Bibliography ==
Books

- Outlines (Poems) London 1960 (printed by W. Ostrowski)
- Portents and Images: A Collection of Original Verse and Translations (London, 1963).
- Like Water, like Fire: Anthology of Byelorussian Poetry from 1828 to the Present Day. London: George Allen & Unwin. 1971. ISBN 978-0-04-891041-7.
- The images swarm free: A bilingual selection of poetry (1982). ISBN 978-0-929849-05-8.
- Image of the Jew in Russian literature: The post-Stalin period (1984). ISBN 978-0-88125-062-6.
- Poems on Liberty: Reflections for Belarus (2004). ISBN 0-929849-05-1
- A Poetic Treasury from Belarus: A celebration of the life and work of Vera Rich (PDF). Hertfordshire Press. 2019. ISBN 978-1-913356-04-0.

Articles

- Rich, Vera (1965). "Maksim Bahdanovic in Byelorussian Literature". The Journal of Byelorussian Studies. I (1): 36–50.
- Rich, Vera (November 1971). "Byelorussian national consciousness and Jewish tradition – Some examples of soviet editorial policy". Soviet Jewish Affairs. 1 (2): 80–89. doi:10.1080/13501677108577098.
- Rich, Vera (January 1973). "Heroes and Jews in byelorussian literature". Soviet Jewish Affairs. 3 (1): 80–91. doi:10.1080/13501677308577150.
- Rich, Vera (20 September 1974). "Vancouver boycott supports Plyushch". Nature. 251 (5472): 180. Bibcode:1974Natur.251..180R. doi:10.1038/251180a0. S2CID 4199394.
- Rich, Vera (19 February 1976). "USSR: Plyushch says protest". Nature. 259 (5544): 520. Bibcode:1976Natur.259..520R. doi:10.1038/259520a0.
- Rich, Vera (30 September 1976). "Soviet dissidents: he who would dissident be". Nature. 263 (5576): 361–362. Bibcode:1976Natur.263..361R. doi:10.1038/263361a0.
- Rich, Vera (9 December 1976). "USSR: bottling up dissent. Reports on recent developments concerning dissidents in the USSR and Eastern Europe". Nature. 264 (5586): 501–502. Bibcode:1976Natur.264..501R. doi:10.1038/264501a0.
- Rich, Vera (8 September 1977). "USSR: discrediting the dissidents". Nature. 269 (5624): 100. Bibcode:1977Natur.269..100R. doi:10.1038/269100a0.
- Rich, Vera (24 November 1977). "Leading Soviet dissidents in London". Nature. 270 (5635): 290. Bibcode:1977Natur.270R.290R. doi:10.1038/270290b0. S2CID 41091196.
- Rich, Vera (15 December 1977). "Stalin's scientific deputy addresses dissident meeting". Nature. 270 (5638): 550. Bibcode:1977Natur.270..550R. doi:10.1038/270550a0.
- Rich, Vera (12 January 1978). "Shcharanskii may soon be brought to trial-without a lawyer". Nature. 271 (5641): 104–105. Bibcode:1978Natur.271..104R. doi:10.1038/271104a0.
- Rich, Vera (18 May 1978). "Yurii Orlov suffers two trials". Nature. 273 (5659): 178. Bibcode:1978Natur.273..178R. doi:10.1038/273178a0.
- Rich, Vera (25 May 1978). "Americans cancel visits in protest over Orlov". Nature. 273 (5660): 258. Bibcode:1978Natur.273..258R. doi:10.1038/273258a0. S2CID 4187105.
- Rich, Vera (6 July 1978). "Shcharanskii trial delayed again, others exiled". Nature. 274 (5666): 6. Bibcode:1978Natur.274....6R. doi:10.1038/274006b0.
- Rich, Vera (22 February 1979). "A day in the life of Yurii Orlov". Nature. 277 (5698): 591. Bibcode:1979Natur.277Q.591R. doi:10.1038/277591a0.
- Rich, Vera (17 May 1979). "Soviet dissident charged". Nature. 279 (5710): 178. Bibcode:1979Natur.279..178R. doi:10.1038/279178b0.
- Rich, Vera (27 August 1981). "Soviet academics: three deprived". Nature. 292 (5826): 789. Bibcode:1981Natur.292..789R. doi:10.1038/292789a0.
- Rich, Vera (11 February 1982). "Soviet dissidents: helpers divided". Nature. 295 (5849): 450. Bibcode:1982Natur.295R.450R. doi:10.1038/295450c0.
- Rich, Vera (12 May 1983). "Soviet human rights: one-way trip for Sakharov?". Nature. 303 (5913): 106. Bibcode:1983Natur.303..106R. doi:10.1038/303106c0.
- Rich, Vera (16 February 1984). "Soviet Union: Orlov's fate in balance". Nature. 307 (5952): 585. Bibcode:1984Natur.307Q.585R. doi:10.1038/307585a0.
- Rich, Vera (23 February 1984). "Orlov appeal". Nature. 307 (5953): 673. Bibcode:1984Natur.307..673R. doi:10.1038/307673b0.
- Rich, Vera (28 March 1985). "Soviet academy: winds of change discerned". Nature. 314 (6009): 307. Bibcode:1985Natur.314Q.307R. doi:10.1038/314307a0.
- Rich, Vera (16 May 1985). "Sakharov: resignation from Soviet academy". Nature. 315 (6016): 169. Bibcode:1985Natur.315..169R. doi:10.1038/315169b0.
- Rich, Vera (16 January 1986). "Refusnik scientists: dissenting dissidents agree". Nature. 319 (6050): 169. Bibcode:1986Natur.319..169R. doi:10.1038/319169b0.
- Rich, Vera (20 February 1986). "Shcharanskii release triggers hopes". Nature. 319 (6055): 611. Bibcode:1986Natur.319..611R. doi:10.1038/319611b0.
- Rich, Vera (9 October 1986). "Soviet Union: freedom at last for Orlov". Nature. 323 (6088): 478. Bibcode:1986Natur.323..478R. doi:10.1038/323478a0.
- Rich, V. (28 May 1987). "Warning from Soviet psychiatrist on doubtful practices". Nature. 327 (6120): 264. Bibcode:1987Natur.327..264R. doi:10.1038/327264b0. PMID 3587343.
- Rich, Vera (11 February 1988). "Sakharov work acknowledged". Nature. 331 (6156): 468. Bibcode:1988Natur.331..468R. doi:10.1038/331468c0.
- Rich, V. (4 August 1988). "Soviet worries about nuclear safety after Chernobyl". Nature. 334 (6181): 373. Bibcode:1988Natur.334..373R. doi:10.1038/334373a0. PMID 3405282.
- Rich, V. (8 September 1988). "Scandal over Soviet artificial blood research project". Nature. 335 (6186): 107. Bibcode:1988Natur.335..107R. doi:10.1038/335107a0. PMID 3412465.
- Rich, Vera (10 November 1988). "Sakharov to stand for Supreme Soviet?". Nature. 336 (6195): 97. Bibcode:1988Natur.336...97R. doi:10.1038/336097b0. PMID 3185738.
- Rich, Vera (May 1989). "Whose tongues are tied?". Index on Censorship. 18 (5): 31. doi:10.1080/03064228908534648. S2CID 144234367.
- Rich, V. (9 November 1991). "Soviet Union: Grigorenko "of sound mind"". The Lancet. 338 (8776): 1159–1222. doi:10.1016/0140-6736(91)92050-C. S2CID 53295097.
- Rich, V. (16 November 1991). "Soviet Union admits to abuses of psychiatry". New Scientist. 132 (1795): 13. PMID 16041887.
- Rich, Vera (1993). "East-west links: Sakharov college struggles on". Physics World. 6 (8): 9–10. doi:10.1088/2058-7058/6/8/7.
- Rich, Vera (1994). "Collaborations: Russian roulette". Physics World. 7 (9): 12–14. doi:10.1088/2058-7058/7/9/14.
- Rich, Vera (1994). "Nuclear Power: North Korean progress ends in deadlock". Physics World. 7 (10): 13. doi:10.1088/2058-7058/7/10/17.
- Rich, Vera (March 1995). "Never mind the language". Index on Censorship. 24 (2): 12–13. doi:10.1080/03064229508535886. S2CID 146891183.
- Rich, Vera (29 April 1995). "Serbian trichinosis row". The Lancet. 345 (8957): 1104. doi:10.1016/s0140-6736(95)90834-x. S2CID 54333768.
- Rich, Vera (6 May 1995). "Chernobyl nine years on". The Lancet. 345 (8958): 1168. doi:10.1016/s0140-6736(95)90994-x. PMID 7723554. S2CID 39117183.
- Rich, Vera (10 June 1995). "China's law on maternal and infant health". The Lancet. 345 (8963): 1497–1498. doi:10.1016/s0140-6736(95)91045-x. S2CID 54357040.
- Rich, Vera (17 June 1995). "Poland's anti-abortion law and a fertility clinic". The Lancet. 345 (8964): 1563. doi:10.1016/s0140-6736(95)91102-2. PMID 11644704. S2CID 32248286.
- Rich, Vera (1 July 1995). "Criminal charges against Bosnian Serb doctors". The Lancet. 346 (8966): 45. doi:10.1016/s0140-6736(95)92670-4. S2CID 206009193.
- Rich, Vera (1 July 1995). "Cholera in Ukraine". The Lancet. 346 (8966): 42. doi:10.1016/s0140-6736(95)92663-1. S2CID 54291448.
- Rich, Vera (15 July 1995). "Poland pursues market-oriented health reforms". The Lancet. 346 (8968): 173. doi:10.1016/s0140-6736(95)91223-1. S2CID 54265348.
- Rich, Vera (22 July 1995). "Ukraine's environmental plea after sewage leak". The Lancet. 346 (8969): 242. doi:10.1016/s0140-6736(95)91288-6. S2CID 53255266.
- Rich, Vera (12 August 1995). "Latvia ceases to provide free health care". The Lancet. 346 (8972): 433. doi:10.1016/s0140-6736(95)92800-6. S2CID 54423533.
- Rich, Vera (12 August 1995). "Hitch in implementing Russia's HIV-prevention law". The Lancet. 346 (8972): 432. doi:10.1016/s0140-6736(95)92797-2. PMID 7623578. S2CID 27290662.
- Rich, Vera (26 August 1995). "Japanese war-time experiments come to light". The Lancet. 346 (8974): 566. doi:10.1016/s0140-6736(95)91396-3. PMID 11644727. S2CID 43573195.
- Rich, Vera (2 September 1995). "New Polish transplant law passed". The Lancet. 346 (8975): 628. doi:10.1016/s0140-6736(95)91447-1. PMID 11654240. S2CID 30372068.
- Rich, Vera (30 September 1995). "Church condemns contraception promotion in Peru". The Lancet. 346 (8979): 894. doi:10.1016/s0140-6736(95)92724-7. S2CID 54353695.
- Rich, Vera (11 November 1995). "Czech doctors strike over pay and health system". The Lancet. 346 (8985): 1288. doi:10.1016/s0140-6736(95)91879-5. S2CID 54234373.
- Rich, Vera (18 November 1995). "Poland's first case on abortion law inconclusive". The Lancet. 346 (8986): 1356. doi:10.1016/s0140-6736(95)92360-8. S2CID 54311199.
- Rich, Vera (16 December 1995). "First college for disabled opens in Russia". The Lancet. 346 (8990): 1622. doi:10.1016/s0140-6736(95)91951-1. S2CID 54288038.
- Rich, Vera (1996). "Słuckija Tkačychi — A Translator's View" (PDF). Sapisy BINiMu (22): 45–58.
- Rich, Vera (6 January 1996). "Russia plans to raise tax on imported pharmaceuticals". The Lancet. 347 (8993): 52. doi:10.1016/s0140-6736(96)91578-0. S2CID 54362152.
- Rich, Vera (20 January 1996). "Influenza epidemic in Russia likely to stay". The Lancet. 347 (8995): 182. doi:10.1016/s0140-6736(96)90353-0. S2CID 54422499.
- Rich, Vera (27 January 1996). "China plans tighter pharmaceutical controls". The Lancet. 347 (8996): 255. doi:10.1016/s0140-6736(96)90428-6. S2CID 54252200.
- Rich, Vera (3 February 1996). "Russia to start anti-poliomyelitis vaccination campaign". The Lancet. 347 (8997): 319. doi:10.1016/s0140-6736(96)90489-4. S2CID 54256238.
- Rich, Vera (24 February 1996). "Alopecia in Ukraine due to heavy metals?". The Lancet. 347 (9000): 528. doi:10.1016/s0140-6736(96)91150-2. S2CID 54242704.
- Rich, Vera (9 March 1996). "Bulgarian doctors' unrest increases". The Lancet. 347 (9002): 683. doi:10.1016/s0140-6736(96)91230-1. S2CID 54239031.
- Rich, Vera (16 March 1996). "Hitches in implementing organ-donation law in Poland". The Lancet. 347 (9003): 754. doi:10.1016/s0140-6736(96)90099-9. S2CID 54318937.
- Rich, Vera (6 April 1996). "Czech doctors call for health reforms". The Lancet. 347 (9006): 964. doi:10.1016/s0140-6736(96)91444-0. S2CID 54231787.
- Rich, Vera (13 April 1996). "Diphtheria penalty in Ukraine?". The Lancet. 347 (9007): 1038. doi:10.1016/s0140-6736(96)90175-0. S2CID 53299971.
- Rich, Vera (13 April 1996). "Georgia's public-health problems "concealed"". The Lancet. 347 (9007): 1037. doi:10.1016/s0140-6736(96)90170-1. S2CID 54296456.
- Rich, Vera (27 April 1996). "Chernobyl's dirty legacy lives on". The Lancet. 347 (9009): 1178. doi:10.1016/s0140-6736(96)90630-3. PMID 8609766. S2CID 43673948.
- Rich, Vera (4 May 1996). "Should Belarus be resettled yet?". The Lancet. 347 (9010): 1251. doi:10.1016/s0140-6736(96)90757-6. S2CID 54235547.
- Rich, Vera (15 June 1996). "Diphtheria vaccination fails in Ukraine". The Lancet. 347 (9016): 1686. doi:10.1016/s0140-6736(96)91510-x. S2CID 54420681.
- a (17 August 1996). "Turkmenistan pushes forward public health". The Lancet. 348 (9025): 469. doi:10.1016/s0140-6736(05)64556-4. S2CID 54330539.
- Rich, Vera (24 August 1996). "Mongolia fights cholera". The Lancet. 348 (9026): 538. doi:10.1016/s0140-6736(05)64685-5. S2CID 54240937.
- Rich, Vera (2 November 1996). "Ukraine's diphtheria campaign". The Lancet. 348 (9036): 1245. doi:10.1016/s0140-6736(05)65521-3. S2CID 54240801.
- Rich, Vera (November 1997). "Grave matters". Index on Censorship. 26 (6): 164–165. doi:10.1080/03064229708536279. S2CID 220985673.
- Rich, Vera (May 1999). "Watch this space". Index on Censorship. 28 (3): 89–93. doi:10.1080/03064229908536592. S2CID 145304247.
- Rich, Vera (October 2001). "Who is Ukraine?". Index on Censorship. 30 (4): 144–149. doi:10.1080/03064220108536988.
- Rich, Vera (October 2002). "The unquiet grave". Index on Censorship. 31 (4): 59–62. doi:10.1080/03064220208537137.
- Rich, Vera (April 2003). "The price of return". Index on Censorship. 32 (2): 82–86. doi:10.1080/03064220308537216.
