= Christian and Paul Voelkner (Pipe organ builders) =

German Empire era organ company

Voelkner
- Pipe organ builders
- Country: German Empire
- Current region: Pomerania
- Origin: Duninowo
- Members: Christian Friedrich, Paul

Christian and Paul Voelkner were pipe organ builders and owners of an organ building company, which operated at the turn of the 19^{th} and 20^{th} centuries. Originally, based in Duninowo (Dünnow) in Pomerania, the firm transferred and expanded in 1906 to Bydgoszcz (Bromberg).

== Christian Voelkner ==
The Voelkner family had been living in Dünnow since 1734, working as teachers, organists, and sextons.

Christian Friedrich Voelkner was born in 1831 and was the son of a local farmer and municipal headman. In his youth, he used to help his father, who was a carpenter by trade and occasionally a piano tuner. Young Christian particularly enjoyed tuning instruments and soon decided to build an organ for the local church of Dünnow. However, daunted by such a challenging task for an unexperienced lad, Christian went first on an apprenticeship at the Buchholz pipe organ workshop in Berlin.

In 1859, Paul's father returned to Dünnow and founded the C. F. Voelkner Dünnow i. Pom. pipe organ firm. He once again resumed working on his unfinished instrument, which proved to be a complete success. This first organ went to be installed in the church of Charnowo (then Arnshagen). Soon, the young entrepreneur began receiving new commissions, which he completed either alone or with the help of a relative. Christian's workshop was set up in a building belonging to his father. All the work was done by hand, as he didn't possess yet any machinery.

After the end of the Franco-Prussian War in January 1871, the demand for organs in Eastern Pomerania swelled. Thanks to government support, many church communities were able to replace their instruments with new ones. As a result, more and more orders flowed into Voelkner's company. Soon, as a result of his diligence and reliable work, Christian was able to purchase a plot of land to build his own house with an adjoining workshop. By this time, he was employing three assistants. Voelkner's carefully crafted, fine-sounding instruments brought him fame beyond its home Pomeranian region, in other regions of German Empire (e.g. Koszalin district, then Köslin). In 1876, Christian Voelkner built a larger factory and a year later he purchased his first machinery. With the number of employees steadily increasing, the company produced its 100^{th} organ in 1888.

Christian Voelkner died on 31 July 1905. He was buried in the cemetery of Duninowo.

=== List of his realisations ===
Year	Location	Edifice	Picture	Keyboard	Pipes	Remarks
ca. 1862	Charnowo (Arnshagen), Pomerania	Church		I		
1869	Zaleskie (Saleske), Pomerania	Church				
ca. 1870	Stary Jarosław (Alt Järshagen), Pomerania	Church		I/P	6	
1874	Wrzeście, Słupsk County (Freist), Pomerania	Church				
1874	Rusinowo (Rützenhagen), Pomerania	Church of the Nativity of Mary		I/P	10	Poor condition
1874/1875	Bytów (Bütow)	Church of St. Catherine and St. John the Baptist		II/P	12	Replacing a 1854 Schulze organ. Destroyed in 1945.
1875	Gwda Wielka (Groß Küdde), Pomerania	Church of Bishop Stanisław		II/P	11	
1878	Duninowo (Dünnow), Pomerania	Church of Our Lady of Częstochowa		II/P	12	Located in Voelkners' hometown.
1879	Żelkowo (Wendisch Silkow), Pomerania	Church				
ca. 1879	Kowalewice (Alt Kugelwitz), Pomerania	Church of the Sacred Heart		I/P	9	Preserved but in poor condition. Presence of a company sign C.F. Völkner, Dünnow.
ca. 1880	Szczeglino (Steglin), Pomerania	Church of Our Lady of the Scapular		I/P	9	Poor condition.
1888	Ustka (Stolpmünde), Pomerania	Church of the Holy Savior		II/P	20	
1893	Stolpe an der Peene, Vorpommern	Wartislaw Memorial Church		I/P	8	
1893	Głazów (Glasow), Pomerania	Church		II/P	10	
1893	Pałowo (Alt Paalow), Pomerania	Church of the Assumption of Mary		II/P	14	Installed on 4 January 1894.
1894	Mönkebude, Mecklenburg-Vorpommern	Church		I/P	7 (9)	Originally installed in Liebenberg, Brandenburg. Transferred in 1984.
ca. 1895	Bezrzecze (Brunn), West Pomerania	Church of Mary Queen		I/P	4	Renovated in 2024.
1895	Sarbinowo (Sorenbohm), West Pomerania	Church of the Assumption of the Blessed Virgin Mary		I/P	8	Renovated in 2005 carried out by the firm Mollin.
1896	Koszalin (Köslin), Pomerania	Catholic Church of St. Joseph		II/P	13	Rebuilt in the 1930s by W. Sauer. Restored in 2003 by the firm Mollin.
1899	Dębnica Kaszubska (Rathsdamnitz), Pomerania	Church				
ca. 1900	Stara Łubianka (Lebehnke ), Pomerania	Church of the Exaltation of the Holy Cross		II/P	10	
No date	Kiełpino (Kelpin), Pomerania	St. Kasimir Church		I/P	10	Very poor condition
No date	Krupy (Grupenhagen), Pomerania	Church of Our Lady of the Gate of Dawn		II/P	11	
No date	Słowino (Schlawin), Pomerania	Church of the Exaltation of the Holy Cross		I/P	10	Poor condition
No date	Bruskowo Wielkie (Groß Brüskow), Pomerania	Church		II/P	10	Renovated in 2008
No date	Ciekocino (Zackenzin), Pomerania	St. Peter Church		I/P	10	
No date	Polanów (Pollnow), Pomerania	Church of the Holy Cross		II/P	19	
No date	Żółtnica (Soltnitz), Pomerania	Church of Our Lady Queen of Poland		II/P	9	Poor condition.
No date	Stary Kraków (Alt Krakow), Pomerania	Church				

== Paul Voelkner ==
Paul Berthold Voelkner was born on 25 February 1869 in Duninowo. In 1900, Christian passed his business on to his son, Paul, who was already well-versed in the art of organ making. Under his management, the manufacturing plant continued to expand. In order to meet the growing demand, the business employed approximately 20 organ builders: this workforce allowed to produce an average of 10 new organs per year.

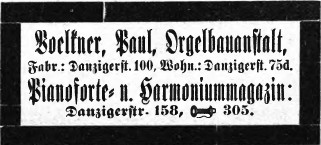
P. Voelkner ad in 1910

The first realisation of Paul's firm was delivered to the newly built Catholic church in Koczała. Voelkners' instruments were now transported to distant places: a German traveler, stopping in Dar es Salaam, discovered there a church equipped with the company's organ (P.B. Voelkner-Dünnow). He completed several semesters at the Königliche Hochschule in Charlottenburg. In 1899, he married Elisabeth Caroline Barbara, née Bösel (or Böse). By 1903, the company produced its 200^{th} organ. Around that time, the firm issued a catalogue displaying the panel of its instruments, Katalog der Kirchenorgel-Bauanstalt mit Dampfbetrieb von P.B. Voelkner, Dünnow, Kr. Stolp i. Pomm. (Catalogue of the church organ building company with steam operation by P.B. Voelkner, Dünnow, Stolp district, Pomerania).

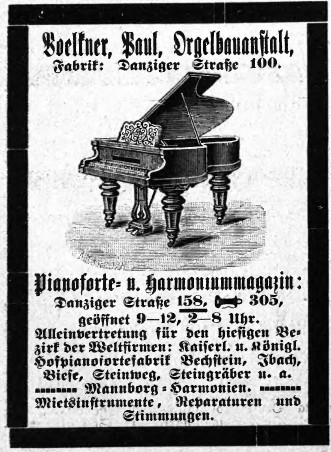
P. Voelkner ad, Bromberg, 1911

Shortly after Paul Voelkner's father death, the factory burned to the ground during the night from 17 to 18 January 1906. Although Voelkner was safe, being away on a business trip, he remained steadfast and decided to sell the plot and build a newer plant, not in Duninowo, but in the larger town of Bydgoszcz (then Bromberg). Once completed, the new facility employed approximately 50 workers and could produce yearly an average of 30 modern, pneumatic church pipe organs.

The factory was located at '100 Danzigerstraße' (today's 140 Gdańsk Street), the store at '158 Danzigerstraße' (today's 24 Gdańsk Street), while Paul and his family lived at '5/6 Bleichfelderstraße' (today's Chodkiewicza Street). At the end of World War I, the re-born state of Poland took over the control of Bydgoszcz. As a German firm, Voelkner's company soon saw its operations inescapably dwindling. Paul sold his property to a Polish businessman whi set up a carpentry workshop in the ancient factory premises. Some of the plant's equipment was purchased by Paul's apprentice, Mieczysław Wybrański. The latter founded his own organ company in 1924.

Paul Voelkner subsequently settled on an estate in Garczegorze near Lębork (Pomerania). In 1924, he left Poland but his subsequent fate remains unknown.

=== List of his realizations ===
The P. Voelkner firm in Duninowo was the successor of C. F. Voelkner Dünnow i. Pom firm. It moved to Bydgoszcz at the beginning of the 20^{th} century and built in total several hundred organs between 1900 and 1916, mainly delivered in the German Empire provinces of West Prussia, Western Pomerania and Posen.

Year	Location	Edifice	Picture	Keyboard	Pipes	Remarks
1901-1902	Remscheid, Rhine Province	Church				
1901-1902	Dar es Salam, German East Africa (today Tanzania)	German Evangelical Church				
1902	Oberhavel, Brandenburg	Church		II/P	9	
1902	Schulzendorf near Gransee, Brandenburg	Church		II/P	9	
1903	Rendsburg, Schleswig	St. Mary Church				Set up in 1903. Replaced by a Walcker organ in 1972.
1903	Talsi (Talsen), Courland, Latvia	Talsi Evangelical Lutheran Church		II/P	26	In 2005, the instrument was restored by A. Melbārdis and J. Kalniņš' organ building workshops.
1907	Bytów (Bütow)	Church of St. Catherine and St. John the Baptist		II/P	23	
1908	Szczecinek (Neustettin), Hinterpommern	Church of the Assumption of the Blessed Virgin Mary		II/P	35	Restored in 2014
1908	Vanagai (Wannagen), Ostpreußen	Evangelical Lutheran Church		II/P	10	Restored in 2003 by Rimantas Gučas
1909	Kołobrzeg (Kolberg), Hinterpommern	Church			23	
1909	Poznań (Posen)	Ancient Evangelical House, then ballroom of the Royal Academy of Poznań. Today the Academy of Music.		II/P	38	
1910	Środa Wielkopolska (Schroda), Großpolen	Church			34	
1910	Chełmno (Kulm)	Franciscan Church of St. James and St. Nicholas		II/P	17	
1910	Gdańsk-Wrzeszcz (Danzig-Langfuhr)	Church of the Sacred Heart of Jesus			42	
1911	Wriezen, Brandenburg	Saint Lawrence Church, desecrated		II/P	18	The original remains preserved in the desecrated church.
1911	Piła(Schneidemühl)	St. Johannes Church			34	
1911	Wałcz (Deutsch Krone)	St. Nicholas Church		II/P	22	
1912	Berlin-Wilhelmshagen	Tabor Church		II/P	18	
1912	Bydgoszcz (Bromberg), West Prussia	Church of the Holy Trinity			40	
1912	Bydgoszcz (Bromberg), West Prussia	Church of the Sacred Heart of Jesus			28	
1912	Słupsk (Stolp), Hinterpommern	St. Mary Church		III/P	48	
1912	Czersk, West Prussia	Church			28	
1912	Lägerdorf, Schleswig	Evangelical Lutheran Church		II/P	13	Restored between 2016 and 2018, the only surviving Voelkner pipe organ in Schleswig-Holstein
1912	Maszewo (Messow), Neumark	Church		II/P	13	Re-constructed in 1868 by Grüneberg
1913	Poznań (Posen)	Church of the Redeemer		III/P	49	Preserved, probably rebuilt after 1945. Overall restoration by Drozdowicz in 2000
1913	Wriezen, Brandenburg	Saint Lawrence Church		II/P	18	
1914	Koronowo (Polnisch Krone), West Prussia	Basilica of the Assumption of the Blessed Virgin Mary				
1914	Attendorn, Rhineland	Church		II/P	13	
1915/1916	Gdańsk-Wrzeszcz (Danzig-Langfuhr)	Church of St. Andrew Bobola		III/P	33	Restored in 1976 by Rychert Wawrzyńiec.
1916	Boleszewo (Rötzenhagen), Hinterpommern	Kirche		I/P	5	
?	Wałcz (Deutsch Krone)	Capuchin Church of St. Anthony		II/P	27	
?	Swornegacie(Schwornigatz), West Prussia	St. Barbara Church				The replaced original console now stands in the room behind the organ. The instrument received additional pipes during the renovation. The nameplate was screwed onto the new console.

== See also ==
- List of pipe organ builders
- Carl August Buchholz
- Registration (organ)

== Bibliography ==
- BIGOSIŃSKI, ADAM KONRAD (2020). DZIAŁALNOŚĆ FIRMY ORGANMISTRZOWSKIEJ P. B. VOELKNER W POZNANIU. Nasza Przeszłość t.133 [ACTIVITIES OF THE P. B. VOELKNER ORGANMAR COMPANY IN POZNAŃ. Our Past T133] (PDF) (in Polish). Köln: Instytut Teologiczny Księży Misjonarzy. pp. 179–212.
- Renkewitz, Werner; Janca, Jan; Fischer, Hermann (2015). Geschichte der Orgelbaukunst in Ost- und Westpreußen von 1333 bis 1944. Band II, 2. [History of organ building in East and West Prussia from 1333 to 1944. Volume II, 2.] (in German). Köln: Von Johann Preuß bis E. Kemper & Sohn, Lübeck/Bartenstein. p. 709.
- Uwe Pape; Hackel, Wolfram; Kirchner, Christhard (2015). Lexikon norddeutscher Orgelbauer. Band 4. Berlin, Brandenburg und Umgebung einschließlich Mecklenburg-Vorpommern [Lexicon of North German Organ Builders. Volume 4. Berlin, Brandenburg and surrounding area including Mecklenburg-Western Pomerania.] (in German). Berlin: Pape Verlag. p. 584.
- Boldt, Hans (1937). Dünnow als ostpommersche Heimstätte deutscher Kirchenorgelbaukunst - Ostpommersche Heimat Nr10 [Dünnow as the East Pomeranian home of German church organ building - East Pomeranian Homeland Nr10] (in German). Berlin: Pape Verlag.
- Brylla, Wolfgang J. (1988). Organmistrz Paul Voelkner z Bydgoszczy - Organy i muzyka organowa [Organmistress Paul Voelkner from Bydgoszczy - Organy and music organowa] (in Polish). Gdańsk: Band VII.
- Boldt, Hans (1930). Kirchenorgel-Baukunst in Dünnow. Unser Pommerland [Church organ building in Dünnow. Unser Pommerland] (in German). Stettin: Fischer & Schmidt. pp. 57–59.
