= Church of the Holy Trinity, Bydgoszcz =

Catholic church in Bydgoszcz, Poland

Coordinates: 53.1244°N 17.9914°E

Church of the Holy Trinity
- Polish: Kościół św. Trójcy
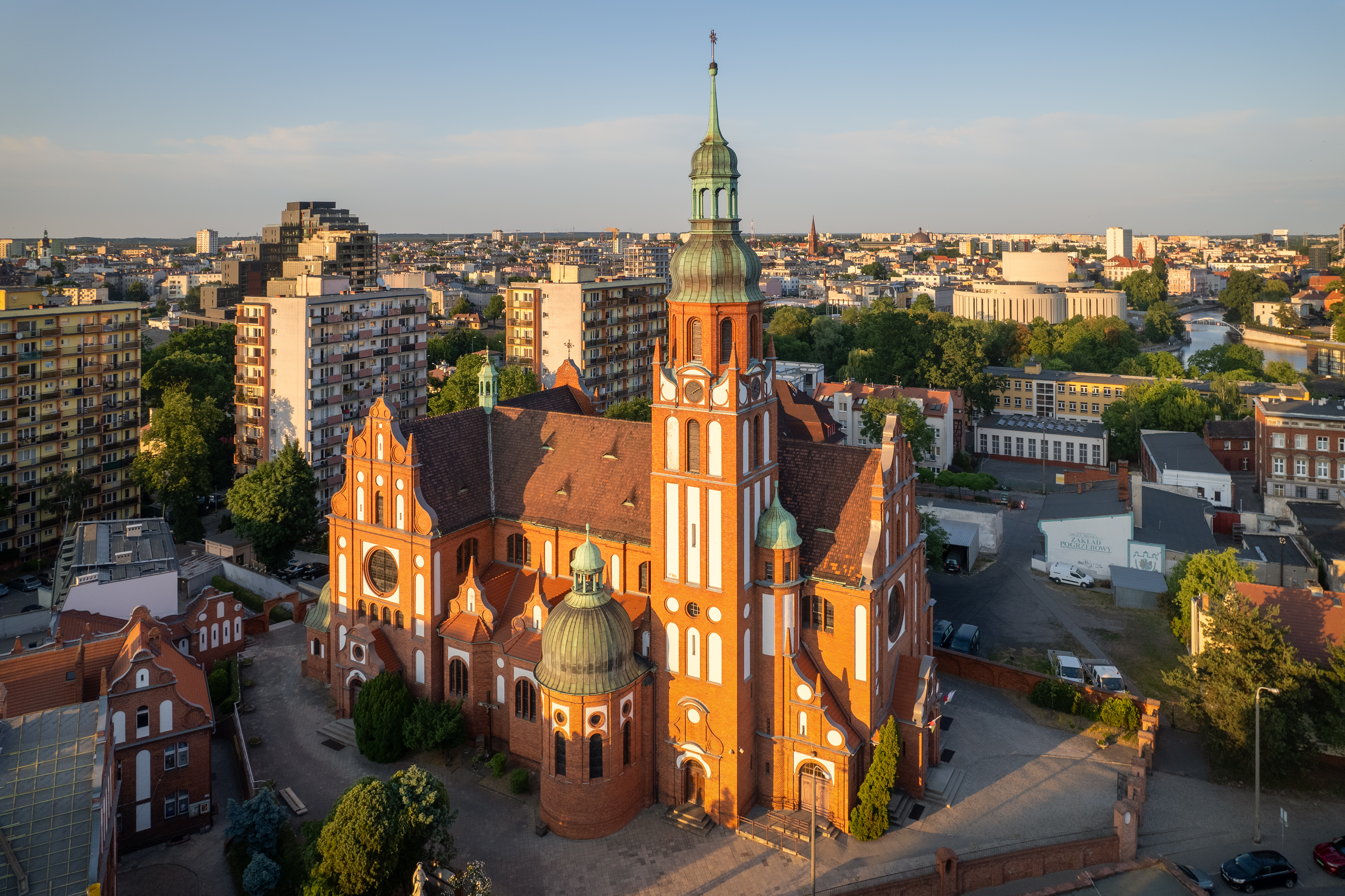
- View of the Church of the Holy Trinity
- Church of the Holy Trinity
- Location: Bydgoszcz
- Country: Poland
- Denomination: Roman Catholic

History
- Status: Church
- Dedication: Holy Trinity
- Dedicated: 18 May 1913

Architecture
- Functional status: Active
- Heritage designation: 601222, Reg. A/752, 20 September 1971
- Architect: Roger Sławski
- Architectural type: Neo-Baroque
- Completed: 1912

Specifications
- Materials: Brick

The Church of the Holy Trinity is a Roman Catholic church in Bydgoszcz, Poland. It stands at 26 Świętej Trójcy Street and is registered on the Kuyavian-Pomeranian Voivodeship Heritage List.

== History ==
=== Old church building ===
The first Church of the Holy Trinity dates back to the second half of the 14th century. At that time, the rich Bydgoszcz burgher Jan Łapimucha funded a one-nave brick church on the outskirts of today's Poznanska street. With construction work dragging on, only the financial support in 1549 of another citizen, Jan Regulski, allowed its achievement in 1556. On 20 May 1579 Bishop Stanislaw Karnkowski from Włocławek consecrated the new church.

In 1596, the church still had not any chaplain, its interior displayed in particular a stone altar with paintings and antependium. Oral tradition indicates that the temple was converted to Protestant rite, then burned down in 1626, following the Swedish invasion. It was rebuilt and refurbished, thanks to the support of Father Sebastian Grotowski, archdeacon of Włocławek. At the time, next to the church was standing the house chaplain, with outbuildings, orchard and gardens, then located in the vicinity of today's old town. A report of the canonical visitation in 1763 shows that the temple was brick made and covered with tiles. On the side stood a wooden tower with two bells. The church was enclosed with a fence planks, with two large gates, to the west and the south. Interiors were made of wood, with a painted ceiling, and fourteen benches decorated with coats of arms. There were also three consecrated altar: the main one bore a picture of the Black Madonna of Częstochowa, the other two were dedicated to Jesus and the Holy Trinity.

Once under Prussian rule in 1772, the temple fell into disrepair. In 1786, Prussian authorities removed all furniture, destroyed pews and altars, and burned the wooden fence. The devastated building then served as a granary, before being converted into 1790 to a powder magazine for the stationed Prussian Rifle Battalion. In 1829 the authorities demolished the remains of the church and the square: the plot was used as a wood storage for a nearby sawmill.

=== Current church building ===
The history of the current church started with a meeting between Polish and German Catholics, conveyed on 29 November 1895: following the dramatic increased of inhabitants in Bromberg in the second half of the 19th century, new Catholic churches needed to be built in the city. The initiative was taken by a local pastor, Father Józef Choraszewski (1834–1899), who had already bought with his own funds two parcels on today's Świętej Trójcy street. His project was to have erected there a seminar and a new church by Bydgoszcz architect builder Józef Święcicki. The blueprint presented a three-aisled building, with a polygonal apse and a transept, crowned with a dome and featuring a Neo-Renaissance front elevation.

Other projects have been raised at the beginning of the 20th century:

- in 1902, by Roman Ziemski, a civil servant of the Bromberg region;
- in 1903, by Bydgoszcz pastor Ryszard Markwart, who commissioned architect Roger Sławski. His concept of Neo-Baroque temple was submitted in August 1903. It was a development of Roman Ziemski's work, with a Neo-Baroque facade crowned by a tympanum displaying a bas-relief of the Christ on the cross.

After obtaining ecclesiastical authorities permission for the church construction on the plot of former temple, harsh discussions started with Prussian authorities, ill-disposed towards Polish Catholics. In 1904, a conference was held in Bromberg with senior officials of the Ministry of Culture in Berlin, which sanctioned the building of a church for Polish Catholics, but also required the consent of Poznań-Gniezno Archbishop to create a distinct affiliate branch of the parish for German Catholics in Bydgoszcz. A final settlement was concluded on 13 February 1906 between archbishop Edward Likowski and the Prussian Ministry of Culture, with both parties agreeing with the construction in the city of two Catholic churches:

- one for German Catholics funded by the state, today's Church of the Sacred Heart of Jesus on Piastowski Square;
- one for Polish Catholics, funded by social contributions, the Church of the Holy Trinity.

Architect Roger Sławski made a new, grander project, in line with the expectations of the Polish community, so as to balance the ambition of the planned German church: the temple had to accommodate 3000 believers and mirror the architectural richness of the Church of the Sacred Heart of Jesus erected for the German community by the Prussian government. First sketches of the new church were drawn in October 1907, the whole project being validated in 1908. On 9 December 1909 building permits were issued.

On 5 July 1910 the dedication stone ceremony of the new building took place. During the excavations were encountered human remains from the old cemetery, work being led by the appointed architect Ludwig Jurkiewicz. The construction was completed in autumn 1912, the new church being consecrated on 18 May 1913 by Gniezno suffragan bishop Wilhelm Kloske. Funds for the project came from various contributions:

- the Polish community in Bydgoszcz and its surroundings (113 000 DM, plus an 80,000 DM bank loan);
- the Roman Catholic Archdiocese of Gniezno (80 000 DM);
- Pope Pius X (8 000 DM).

At the time, the church celebrated worship only in Polish. The Church of the Holy Trinity has been the only Polish Catholic church which creation was granted by German authorities in Bydgoszcz during Prussian period.

The temple originally served as a subordinated branch of the Bydgoszcz cathedral parish church, before being erected in 1924 as a parish on its own by a decree signed by Cardinal Edmund Dalbor.

The rectory building has been built between 1912 and 1915, originally for a German citizen, Bernard Korth, who had there his house and a factory. The plot was bought from his widow in 1930 to house the curate and the parish hall.

During interwar period, internal decoration was completed with the set up of a pipe organ, polychromes, as well as the completion of the parish cemetery located at today's Lotników street.

In 1948, the three bells (Wojciech, Józef and Stanisław) looted by Nazi forces during World War II have been returned to the parish. Between 1972 and 1995, a series of modernization and repairs occurred, including the renovation of the facade, the roof structure and organs. In 1986, the catechist house was erected behind the parish hall. On 19 May 2013 a thanksgiving mass was held to celebrate the 100th anniversary of the consecration of the church under the leadership of the local Ordinary Diocese of Bydgoszcz bishop Jan Tyrawa. Since 1996, the Bydgoszcz Music Academy - "Feliks Nowowiejski" organizes in the church the Festival of Young Organists and Vocalists- "Jerzy Popieluszko", (Polish: Ogólnopolski Festiwal Młodych Organistów i Wokalistów im. Jerzego Popiełuszki).

== Characteristics ==
=== Architectural style ===
The church, along with other parish buildings, have been built in Neo-Baroque style, with a brick facade and plastered panels. It is characterized by a basilica-like transept, which had no precedent at the time in the Catholic buildings of Bydgoszcz. The church has an asymmetrical footprint of 1038 m^{2}, and a volume of 16000 m^{3}.

The temple is three-aisled with a chancel facing north. To the west stand a 52-metre-high tower topped by a ridge turret and an adjacent circular chapel dedicated to Our Lady of Czestochowa, referring to the dedication of the initial Gothic church. Facade, gable and tower are adorned with typical Neo-Baroque elements such as volutes and finials, which are also present in the chapels, the sacristy and the staircase leading to the choir.

=== Interiors ===
In the nave one can notice the use of barrel vault with lunettes, while groin vaults are present in the transept. Inside space is divided by semicircular arcades with pilasters. Overall interiors decoration has been supervised in the 1920s by architect Adam Ballenstedt.

Roger Sławski designed the benches, the pulpit, the confessional and the layout of the floor. Polychrome has been realized in 1926 by Leon and Władysław Drapiewski and stained glass windows by Wiktor Gosiecki from Gniezno.

In the chancel stands a sculpture of the Holy Trinity, flanked by Saint Casimir and Saint Adalbert of Prague, realized by Władysław Marcinkowski from Poznań. The painting in the chapel of the Virgin Mary dates back to the original church décor.

The pipe organ was built in 1912 by Paul Voelkner: it features more than 40 organ stops.

The edifice has been registered on the Kuyavian-Pomeranian Voivodeship Heritage List Nr.601222 Reg.A/752, on 20 September 1971.

== Gallery ==
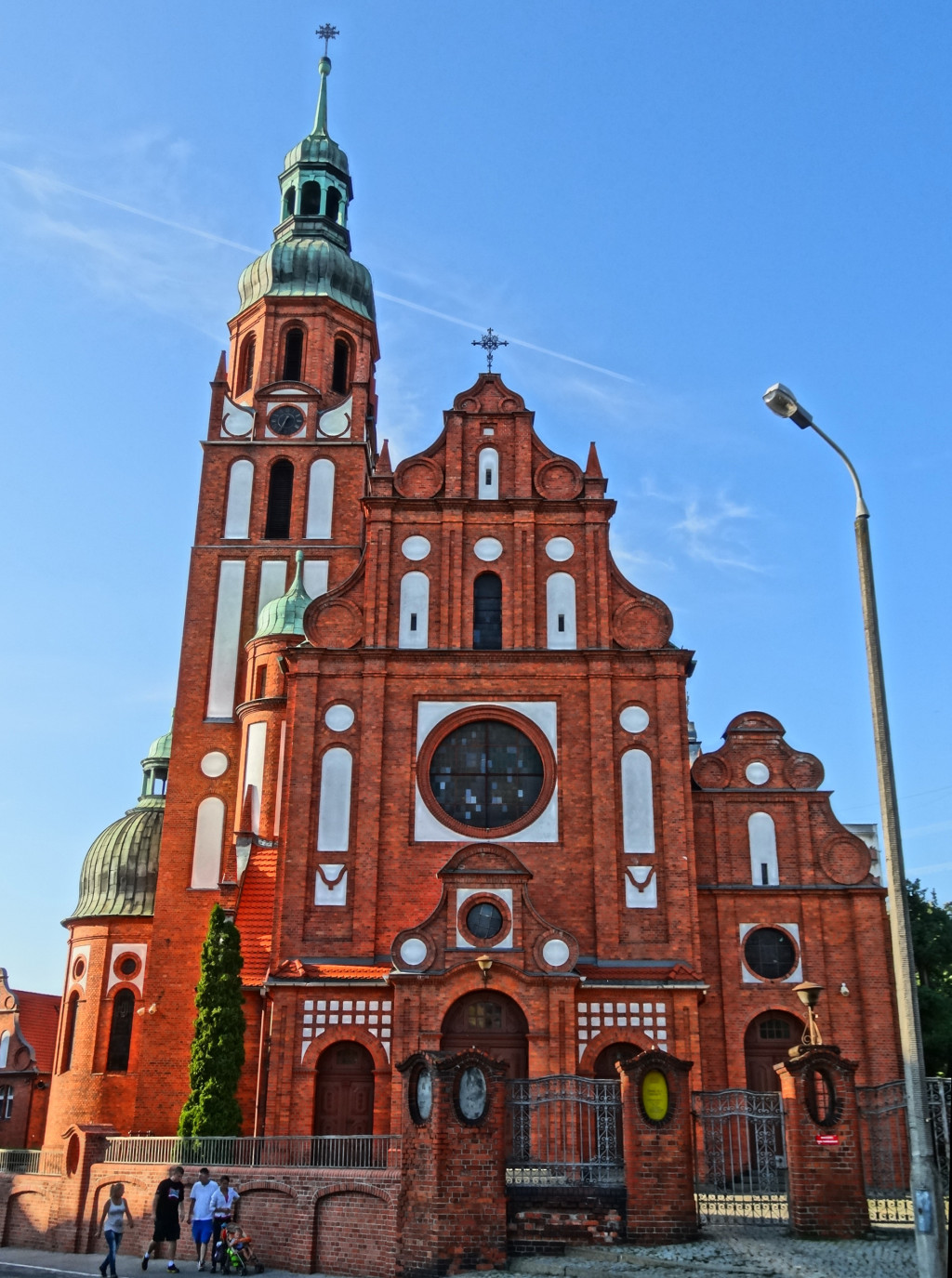
Main Elevation

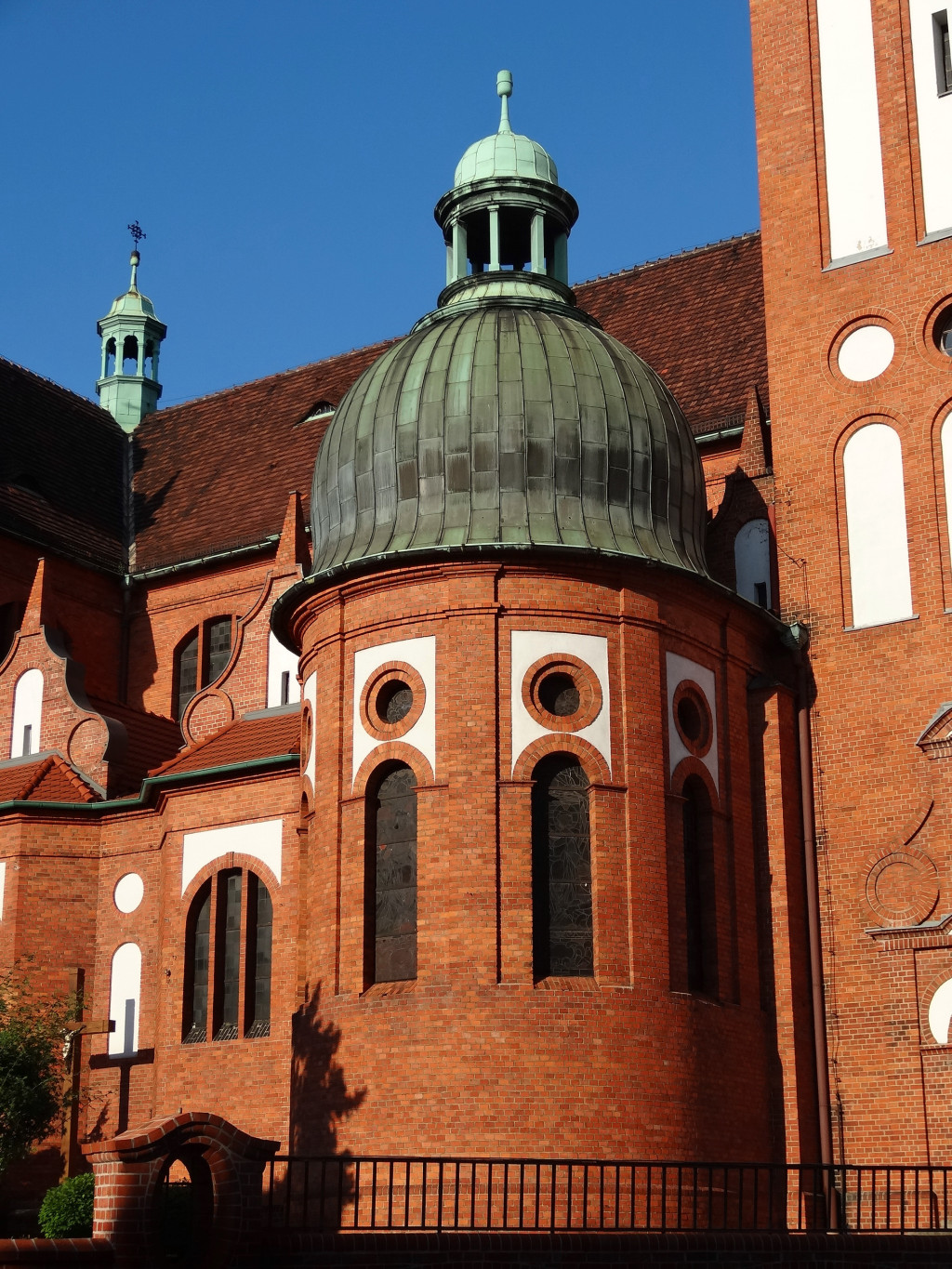
Our Lady of Czestochowa chapel

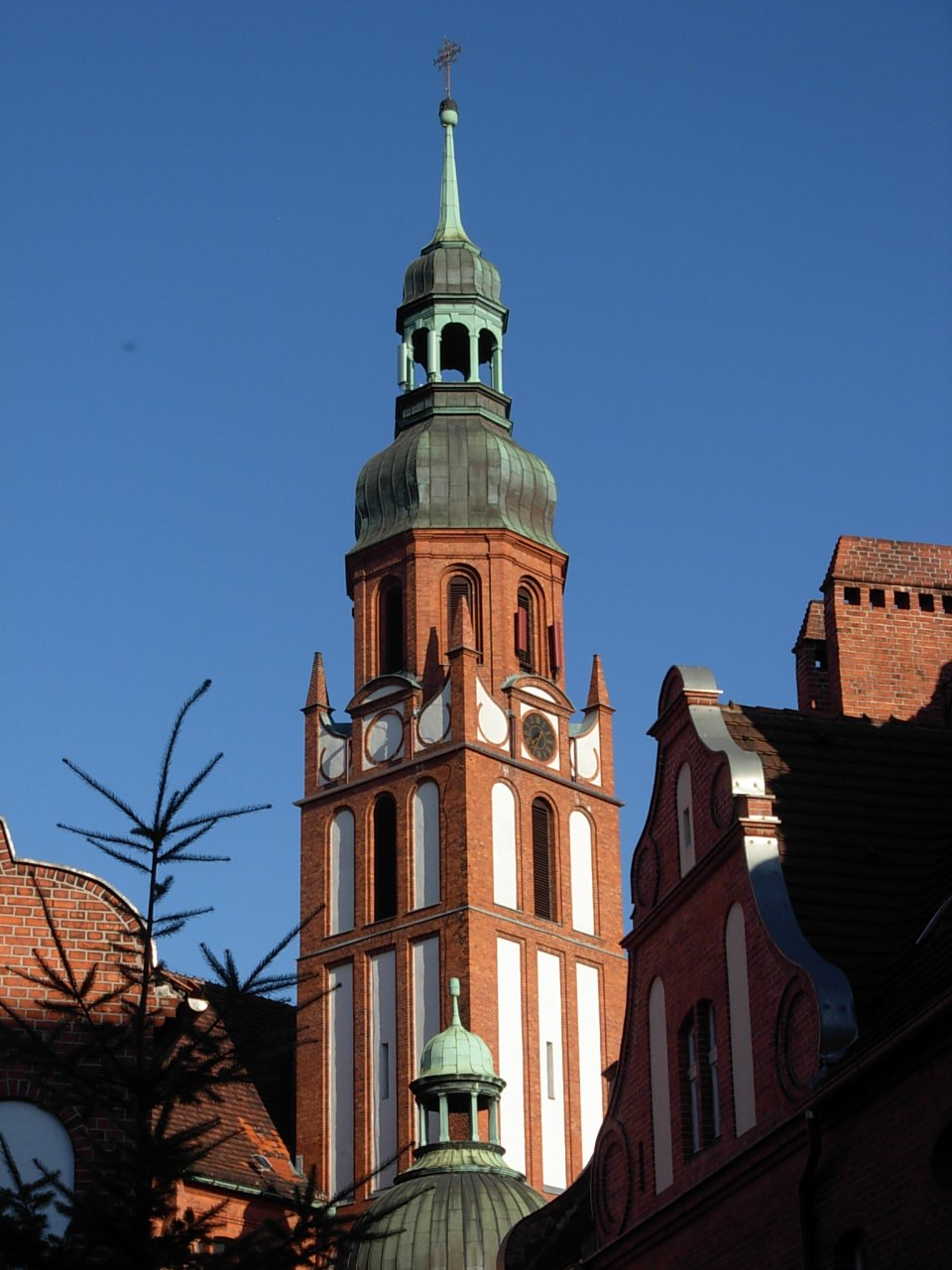
The bell tower with its Ridge turret

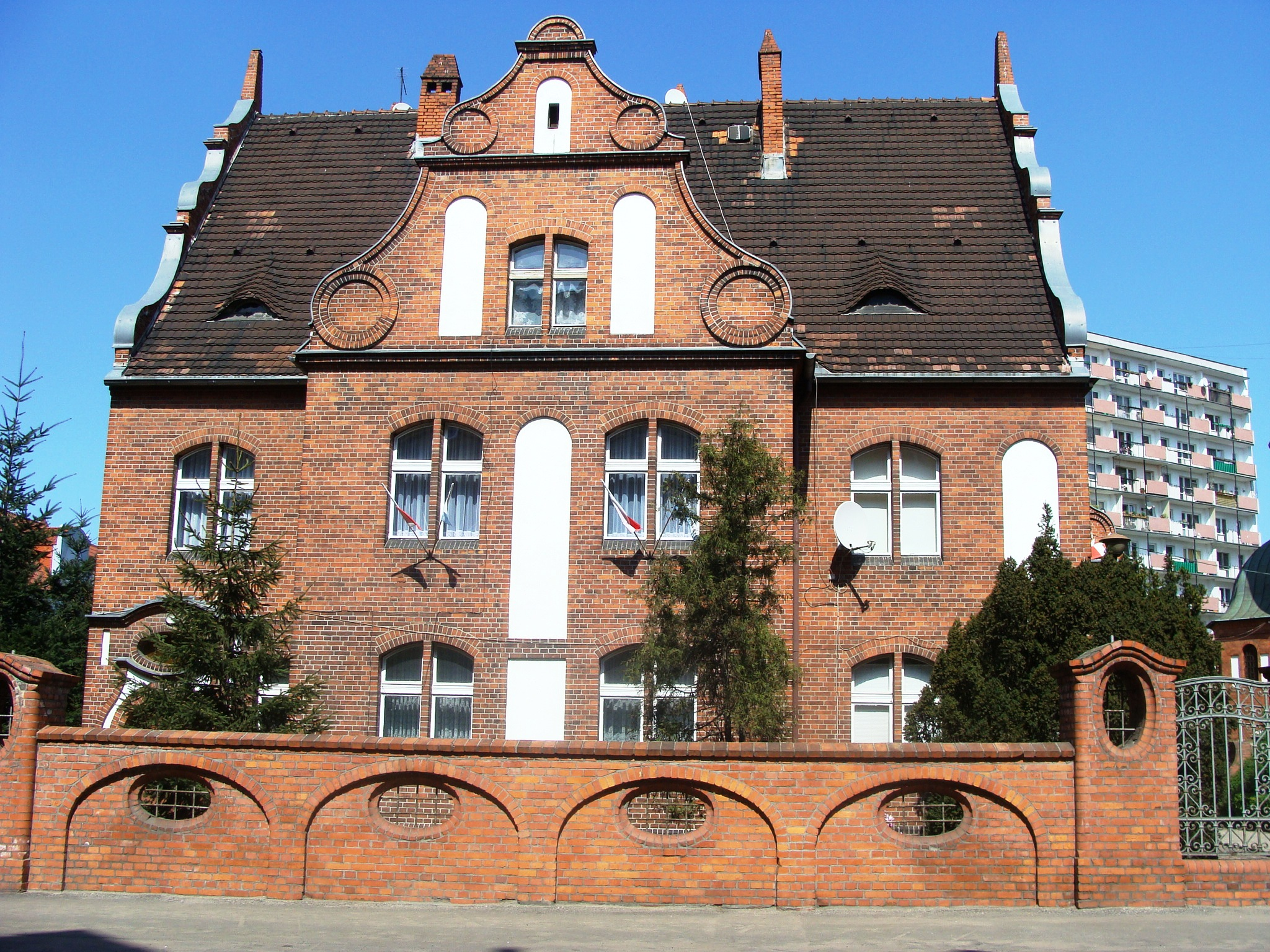
Curate house

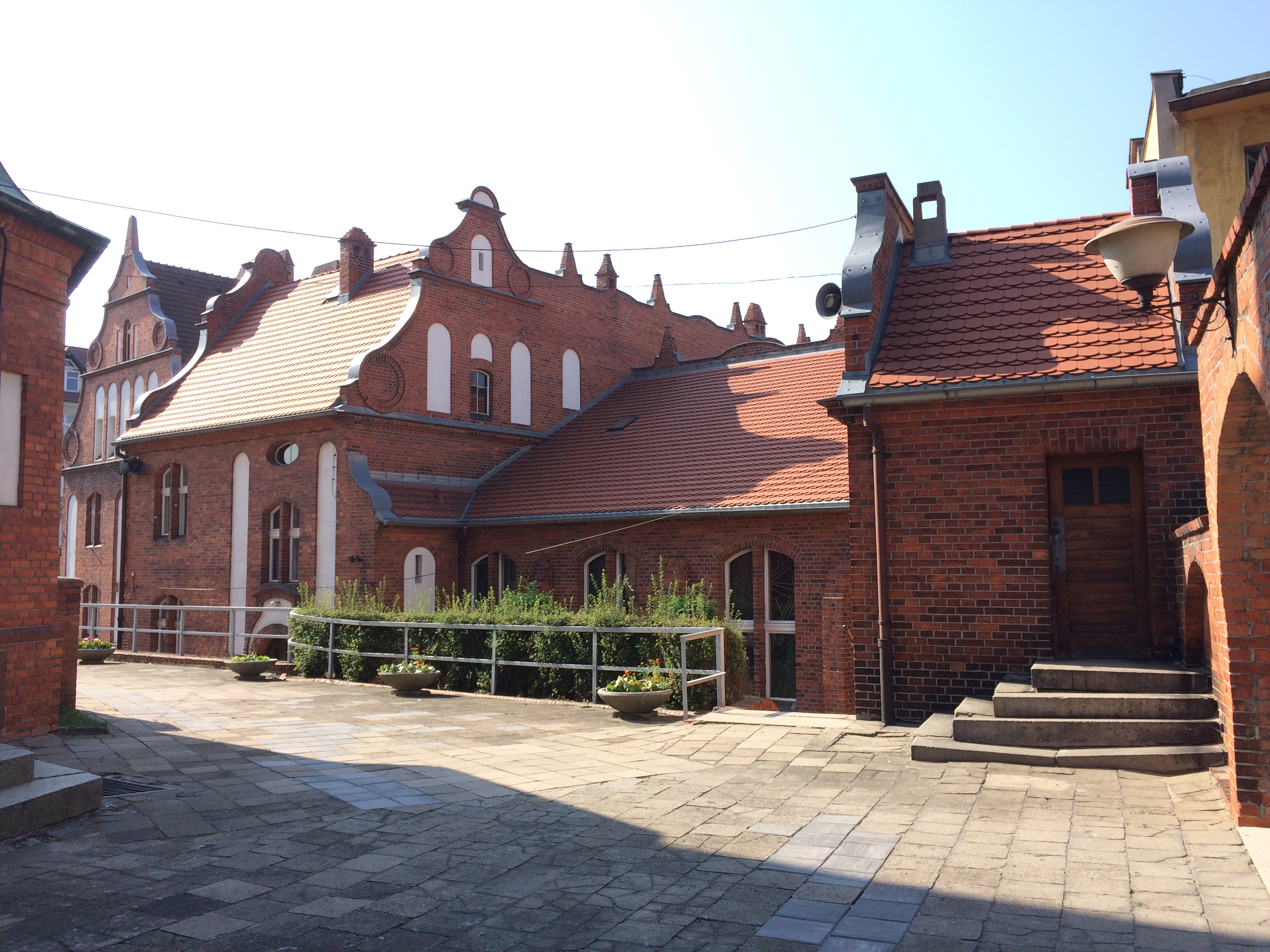
1986 catechism house

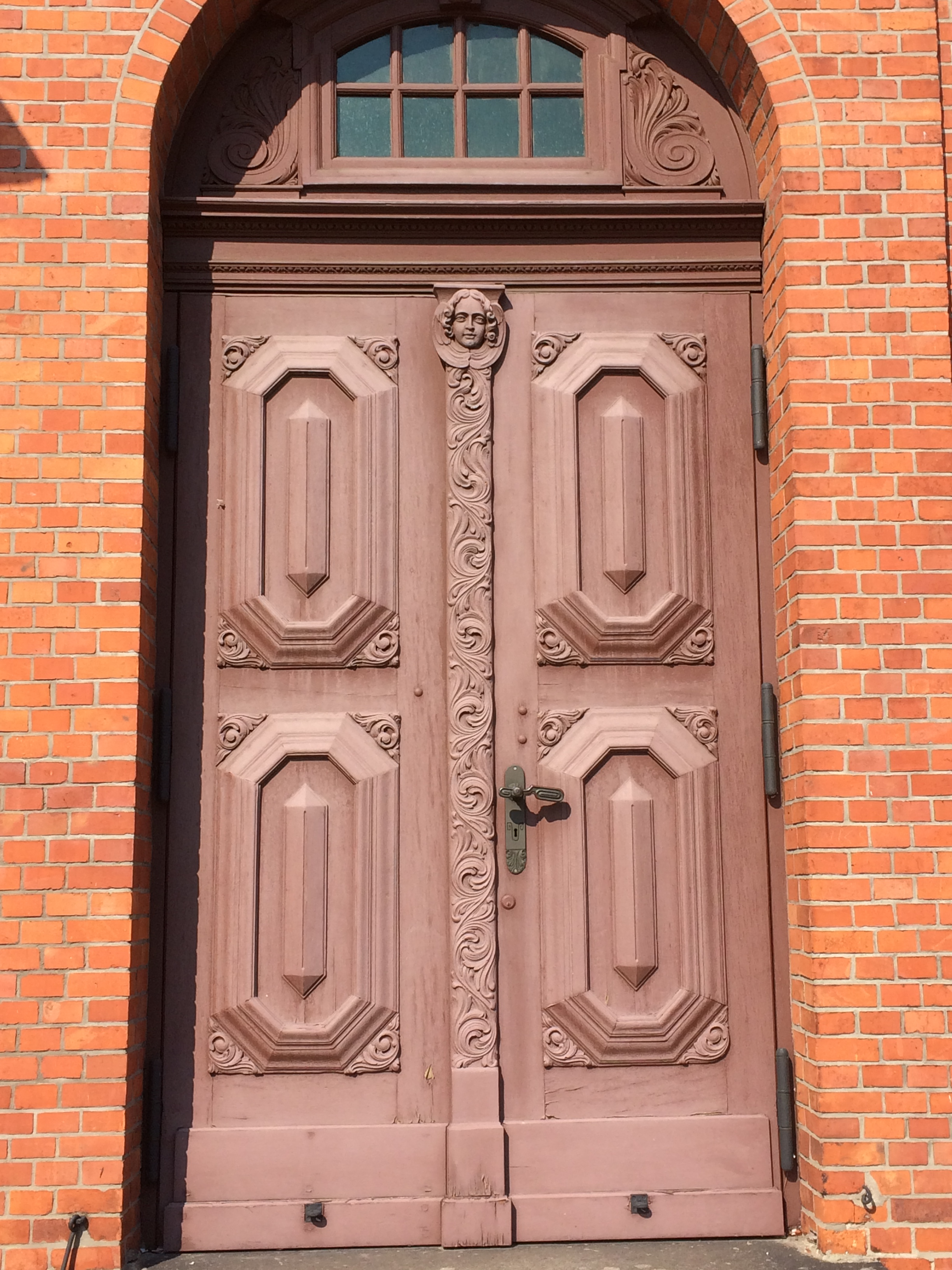
Facade side door

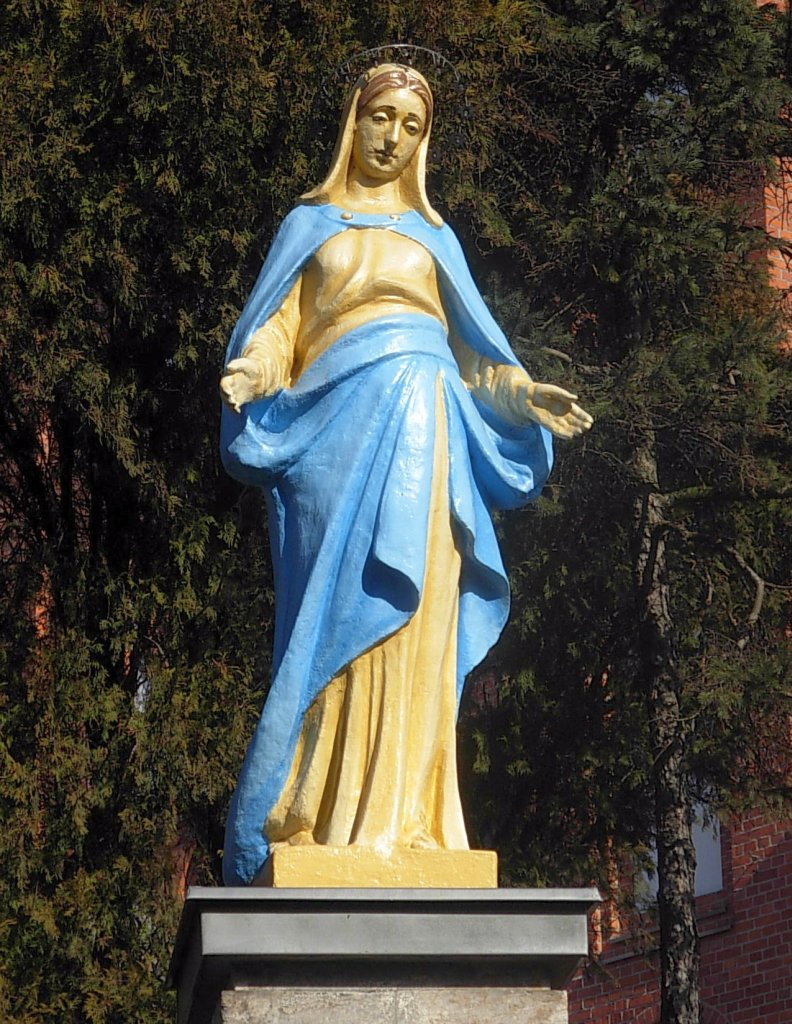
Statue of Virgin Mary of the Immaculate Conception in front of the church, by Piotr Triebler

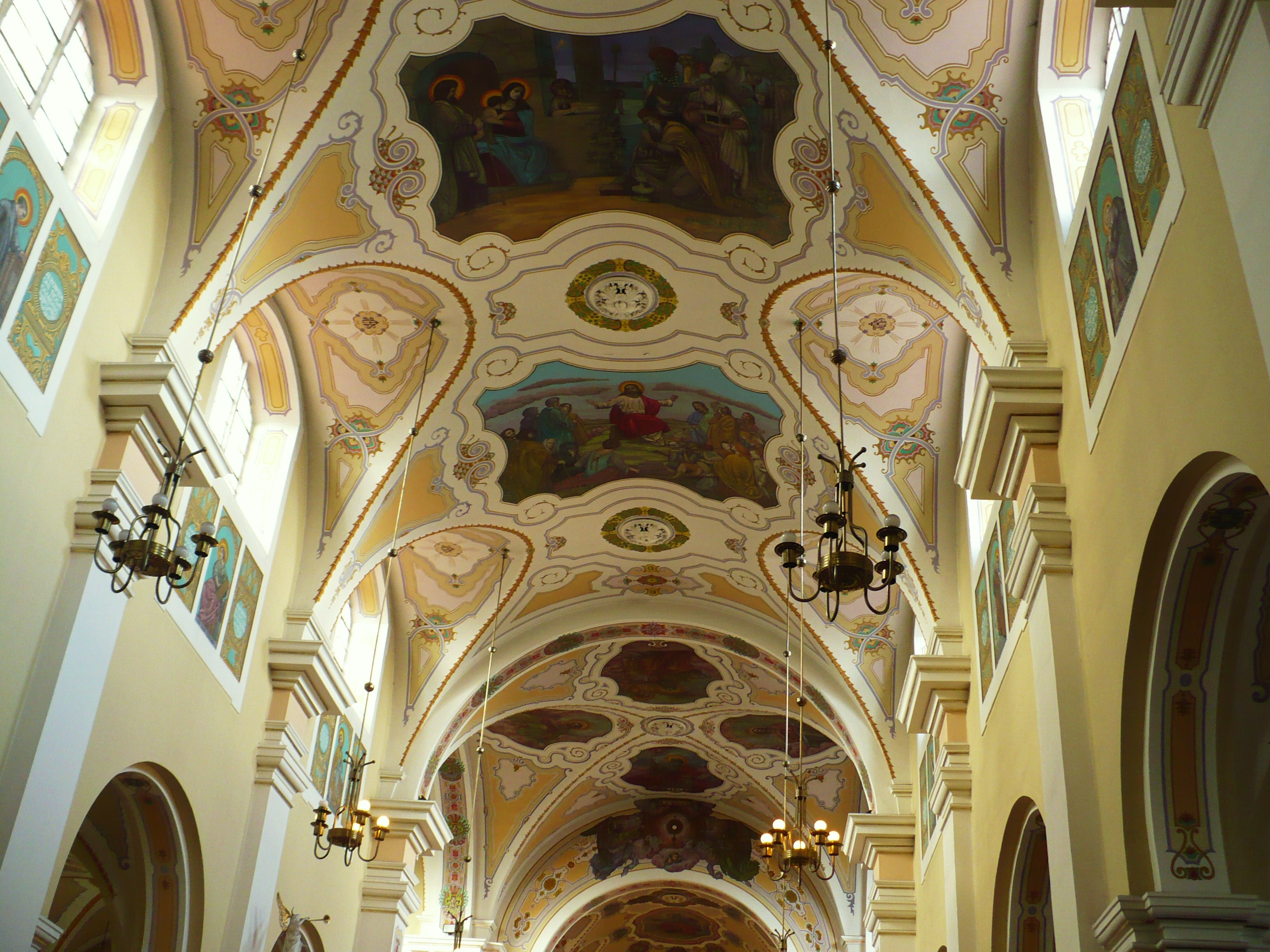
Nave with polychrome

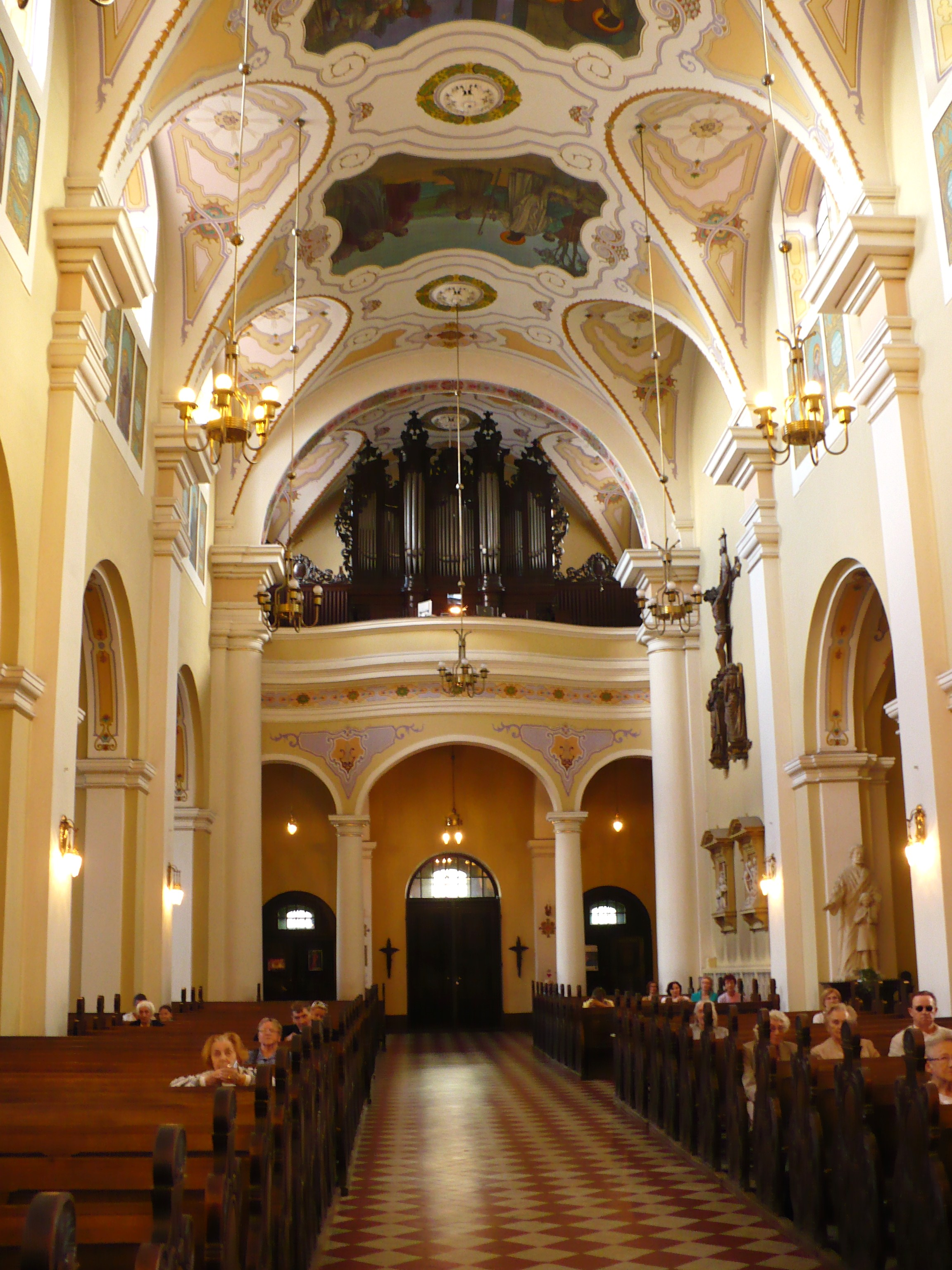
Pipe organ

== See also ==
- Bydgoszcz
- Paul Voelkner (Pipe organ builder)

== Bibliography ==
- Gołębiewski, Jerzy (1996). Parafia i kościół pod wezwaniem Świętej Trójcy. Kalendarz Bydgoski (in Polish). Bydgoszcz: Towarzystwo Miłośników Miasta Bydgoszczy. pp. 206–209.
- Borodij Eugeniusz, Chamot Marek, Kabaciński Ryszard, Kutta Janusz, Pastuszewski Stefan. Kościół katolicki w Bydgoszczy - Kalendarium (in Polish). ydgoszcz: Praca zbiorowa.
