= Church of the Sacred Heart of Jesus, Bydgoszcz =

Catholic church in Bydgoszcz, Poland

Church of the Sacred Heart of Jesus
- Polish: Kościół Najświętszego Serca Pana Jezusa
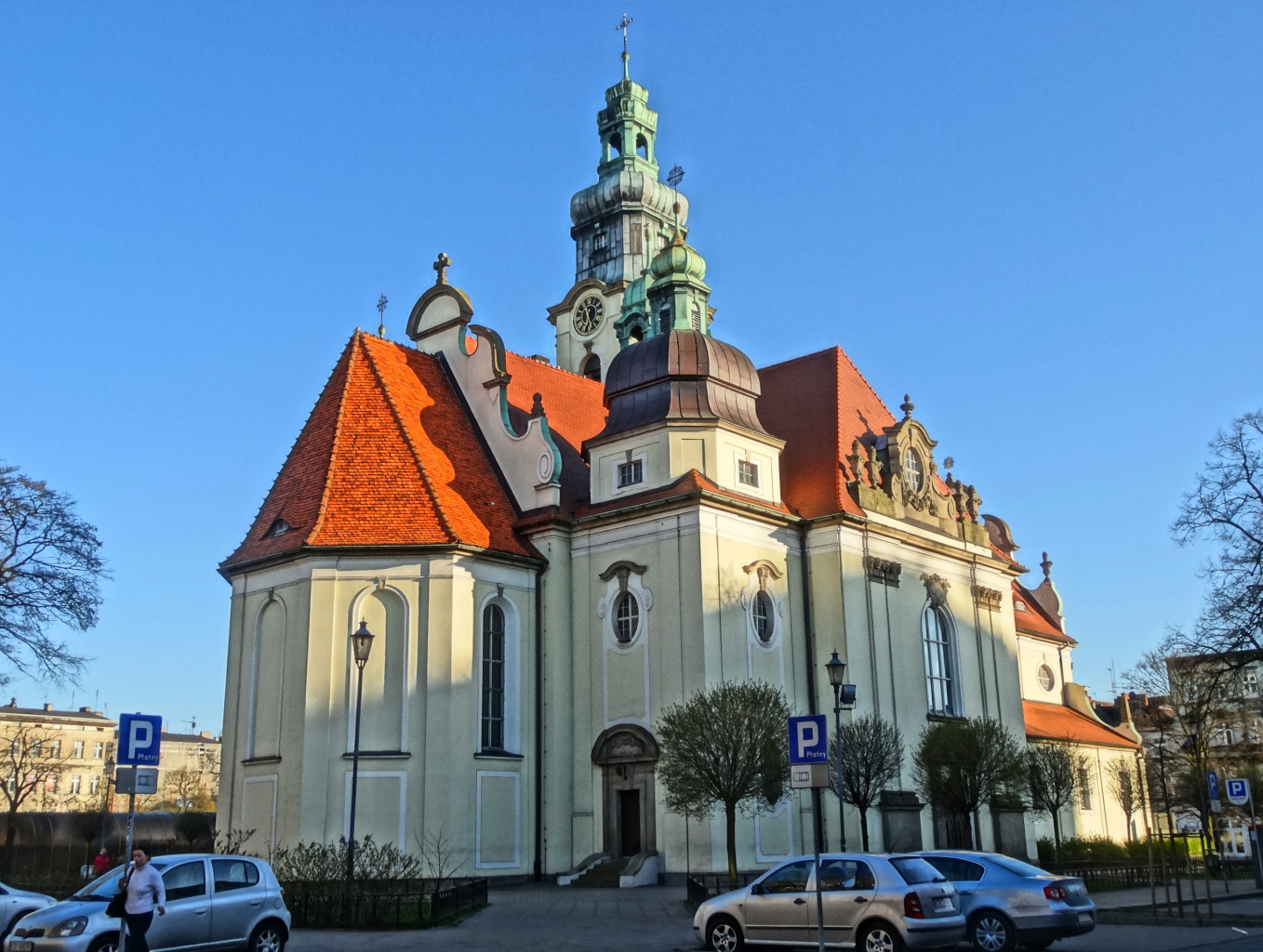
- View of the Church of the Sacred Heart of Jesus, from Piastowski Square
- Church of the Sacred Heart of Jesus
- 53°7′55″N 17°59′53″E
- Location: Bydgoszcz
- Country: Poland
- Denomination: Roman Catholic

History
- Status: Church
- Dedication: Sacred Heart of Jesus
- Dedicated: 19 June 1913

Architecture
- Functional status: Active
- Heritage designation: Nr. 601221, Reg.A/746, 12 December 1971
- Architect: Oskar Hoßfeld
- Architectural type: Neo-Baroque
- Completed: 1913

Specifications
- Materials: Brick

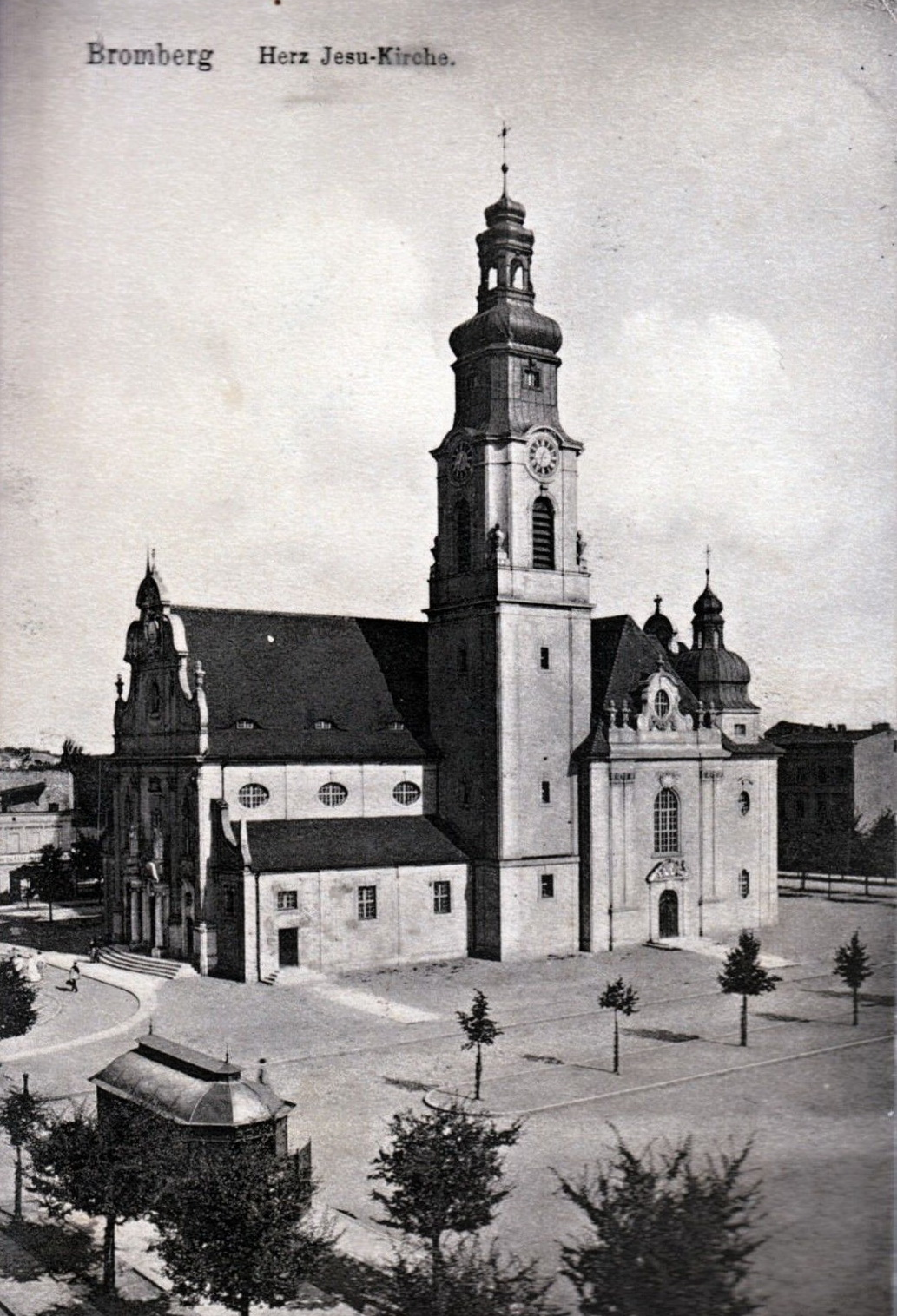
The Church in 1914

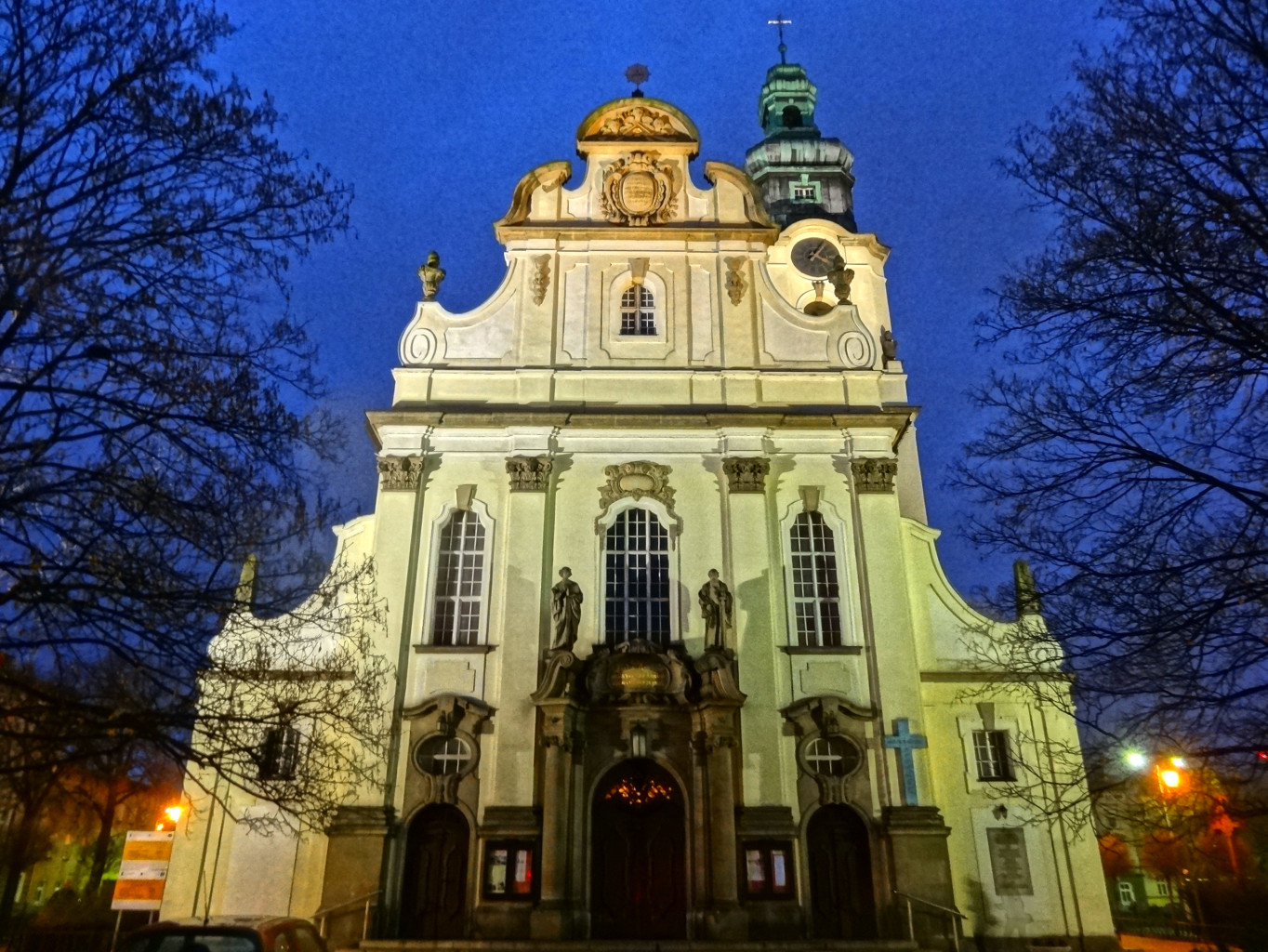
Main portal by night

The Church of the Sacred Heart of Jesus is a historical Roman Catholic building in Bydgoszcz, Poland. It stands at 5 Piastowski Square in the city's downtown district Śródmieście. The church is registered on the Kuyavian-Pomeranian Voivodeship Heritage List.

== History ==
The history of the church is associated with the efforts of the Polish community, which, since 1898, strived to obtain the consent of the Prussian authorities to build a new Catholic church in the city. Consent was granted in 1906, under the condition that two Catholic churches would be established: one for Poles (Holy Trinity Church) and one for Germans (Church of the Sacred Heart of Jesus). The construction site for the German Catholic church was chosen at Elisabethmarkt, then a city square. The church was built from 1910 to 1913 with funds from the government, papal gift and contributions of German Catholics in Bydgoszcz.

The preliminary design of the church was performed in the Department of Civil Engineering Design of Public Works in Berlin in May 1908. The main architect and builder was Oskar Hoßfeld (1848–1915), from Thuringia. He was at the time considered a specialist in the construction of churches, such as in Poznań, Szczecin and Legnica. During the construction in Bydgoszcz, he was assisted by a city senior official, Mr Herrmann and builder managers, Mr Handke and Mr Asmann. The church was built with Baroque Revival architecture features, including a basilica with an apse, a transept and an internal great domed rotunda. The style of the church refers to Baroque churches in northern Germany.

The building was consecrated by the suffragan bishop from Gniezno, Wilhelm Kloske, on 19 June 1913. Initially, the building was an auxiliary church subordinated to the cathedral parish of Bydgoszcz. Reserved for the use of German Catholics, the church was opened to both communities, German and Polish, on 17 February 1924. Until the outbreak of World War II, the church was the property of the municipality.

In 1921, young organist Szczepan Jankowski (1900–1990) was nominated. Despite his blindness, he became a famous composer with studies and recognition from many universities (Poznań, Leipzig, Munich, Berlin and Paris). For his great services to the Church, Pope Paul VI honored him in 1964 with the Medal Pro Ecclesia et Pontifice. He lived at 55 Śniadecki Street, where a plaque was unveiled in 2008 in memoriam.

In 1924, Cardinal Edmund Dalbor issued a decree related to the creation in Bydgoszcz of five new parishes, including the parish of the Sacred Heart of Jesus. The first parish priest in 1925 was Kazimierz Stepczyński, murdered by Nazis in 1939.

During World War II, the church did not suffer too much from the ravages of the conflict. The interiors were refurbished from 1982 to 1988, and in 2002, a new façade and an outer illumination were installed.

== Characteristics ==
The church is considered one of the most beautiful Historicist-style churches built in Bydgoszcz at the turn of the 20th century. The church was registered on the Kuyavian-Pomeranian Voivodeship Heritage List Nr. 601221 Reg. A/746, on 10 December 1971.

=== Architectural style ===
The church follows the Neo-Baroque style, with a plastered façade which distinguishes it from many others built in Bydgoszcz during the second half of the 19th century and the early 20th century, which are usually adorned with a high-quality ceramic and many architectural details. It has the characteristics of a basilica with a dedicated transept, over which rises the dome.

The church has three aisles, with the chancel facing north: it has two chapels, and two sacristies. It can accommodate approximately 2000 believers. There are three main entrances and two side ones. In total, the church is 812 m^{2} large. It is a relatively early example of reinforced concrete structure in the city. The church tower is 48.4 m high, and topped with a bulbous dome carrying with a lantern. Inside the dome, in addition to the bells, a clock tower strikes the hour and the half-an-hour. It was built in 1912 by German company Ed. Korfhage & Soehne Melle, which still exists to this day. The gutters, cupola and flèche are all copper-plate roofed.

The façade is distinguished by its pilasters topped with attic-style decoration. The main nave, the chancel and transept sides are ornamented with barrel vaults. The nave floor is covered with red sandstone, and chancels with marble slabs.

=== Architectural details ===
Rich Baroque motifs adorn both church interiors and façade: cartouches with writings, volutes, flaming vases, putti, rococo painting ornaments, and festoons. The portal displays richly decorated stone statues of Saint Peter and Saint Paul. The transept boasts columns heaving balconies with statues of angels.

The frescoes on its vaults and ceilings were made by painter Ernest Fey from Berlin. The two apostle figures on the façade portal were created by Schreiner from Regensburg. The exterior figures are the work of Meyer and Weber from Wilmersdorf. Interior sculptures, such as the Atlas of the matroneum organ and the four groups of angels in the transept, were created by Frank Vauschutz from Charlottenburg.

=== Altars ===
Six altars stand in the church:

1. The main altar, initially decorated with the image of the Heart of Jesus by Boleslaw Lewański. It was replaced in 1930 by the image of the Sacred Heart of Jesus, by professor Faczyński;
2. The altar in the left aisle, with a picture of the Assumption of Mary;
3. The altar in the right aisle, with a picture of Saint Joseph;
4. The second altar in the right aisle, with a statue of Saint Anthony of Padua, by professor Giecewicz in 1924;
5. The altar in the chapel adjacent to the chancel, where the picture of the Sacred Heart by Boleslaw Lewański has been located since 1930, initially at the main altar;
6. The altar in the chapel adjoining the left aisle, which initially housed a statue of Our Lady of Sorrows. However, it is now replaced by a stylish Baroque altar by sculptor Skręt from Bydgoszcz, along with an image of Saint Thérèse of Lisieux by professor Faczyński. A Pietà stands now in the right aisle.

=== Bells ===
In the church tower hangs three steel bells, with a combined weight of more than 5.6t:

- The smallest, christened Ave Maria, gratia plena Dominus Tecum ('Hail Mary, full of grace, the Lord is with thee');
- The medium, christened Omnia ad Dei Major gloriam ('All for the greater glory of God');
- The largest, christened Cor Jesu sacratissimum Miserere nobis ('Sacred Heart of Jesus have mercy on us').

The bells are electrically powered, cast in Bochum in 1912.

=== Pipe organ ===
The pipe organ was built in 1912 by Paul Voelkner from Bydgoszcz, as a 28-voice instrument. In 1942, it has been rebuilt by Josef Goebel from Gdańsk, and increased by one voice. In 1968, tubular bells replaced the original ones. The instrument has two keyboards and one pedal, with a pneumatic tracker (air being forced through a noiseless fan). In April 2012, a major renovation was carried out.

== Gallery ==
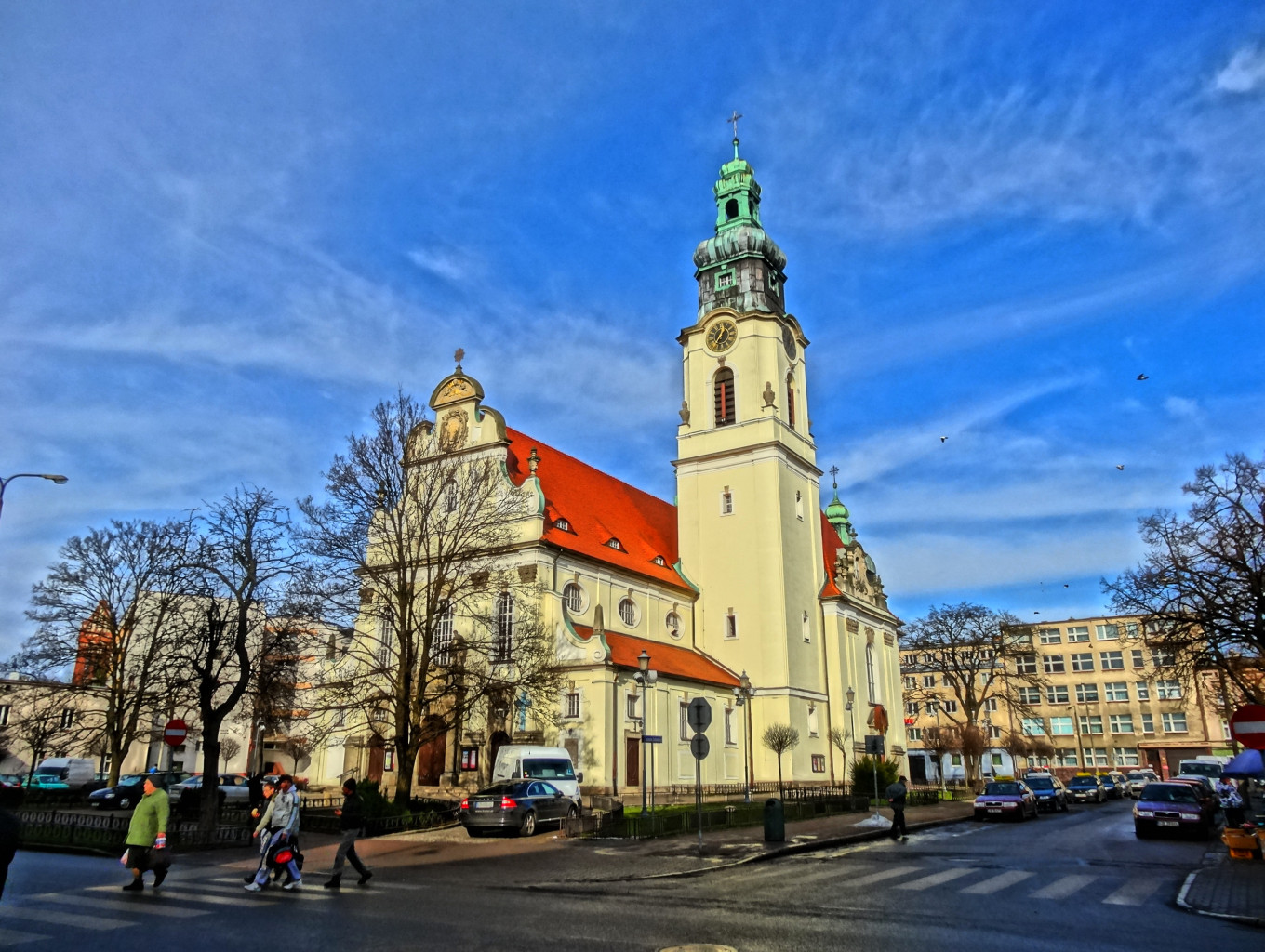
View from Śniadecki Street

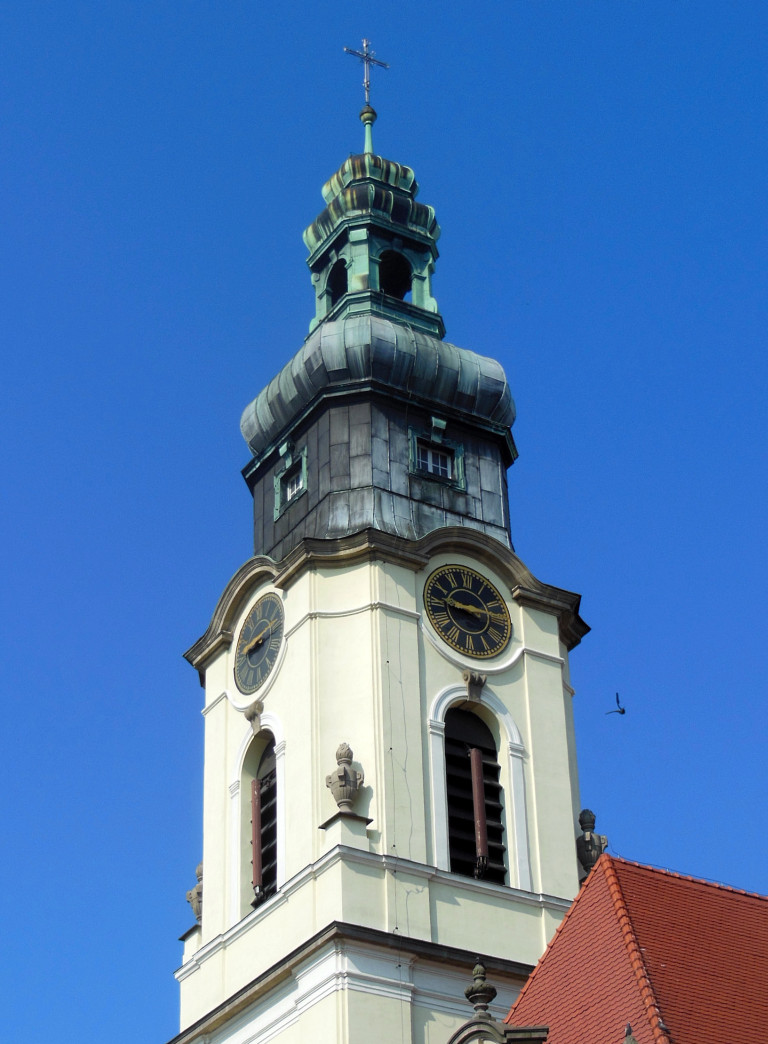
Detail of the clock tower

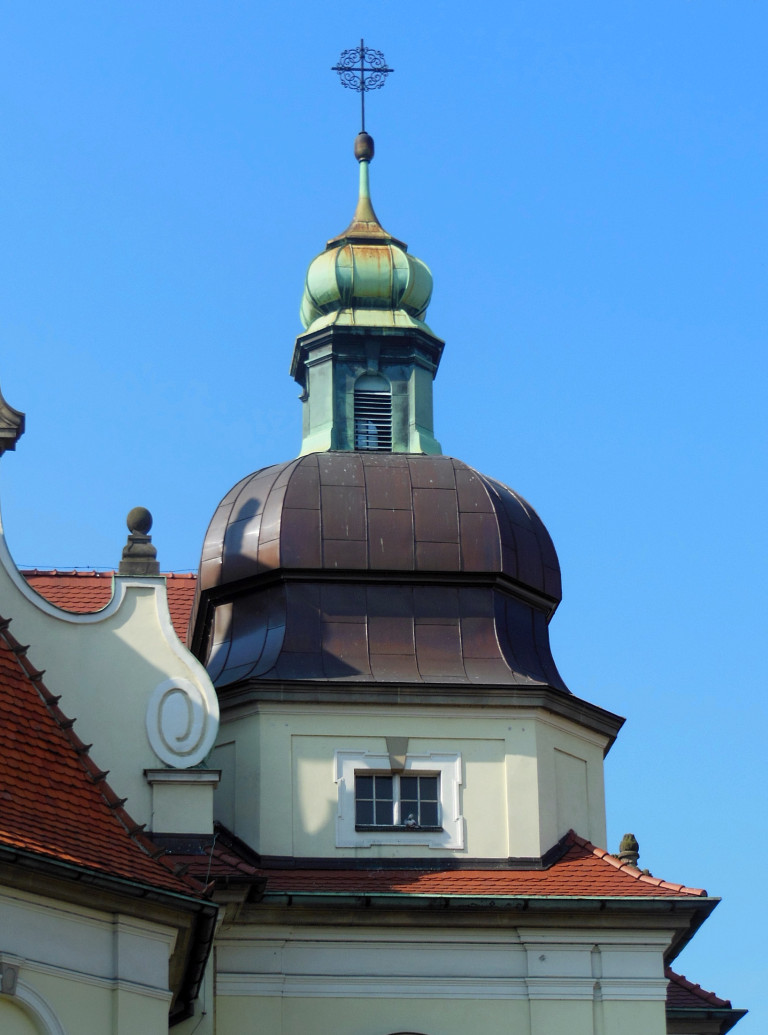
Detail of a finial

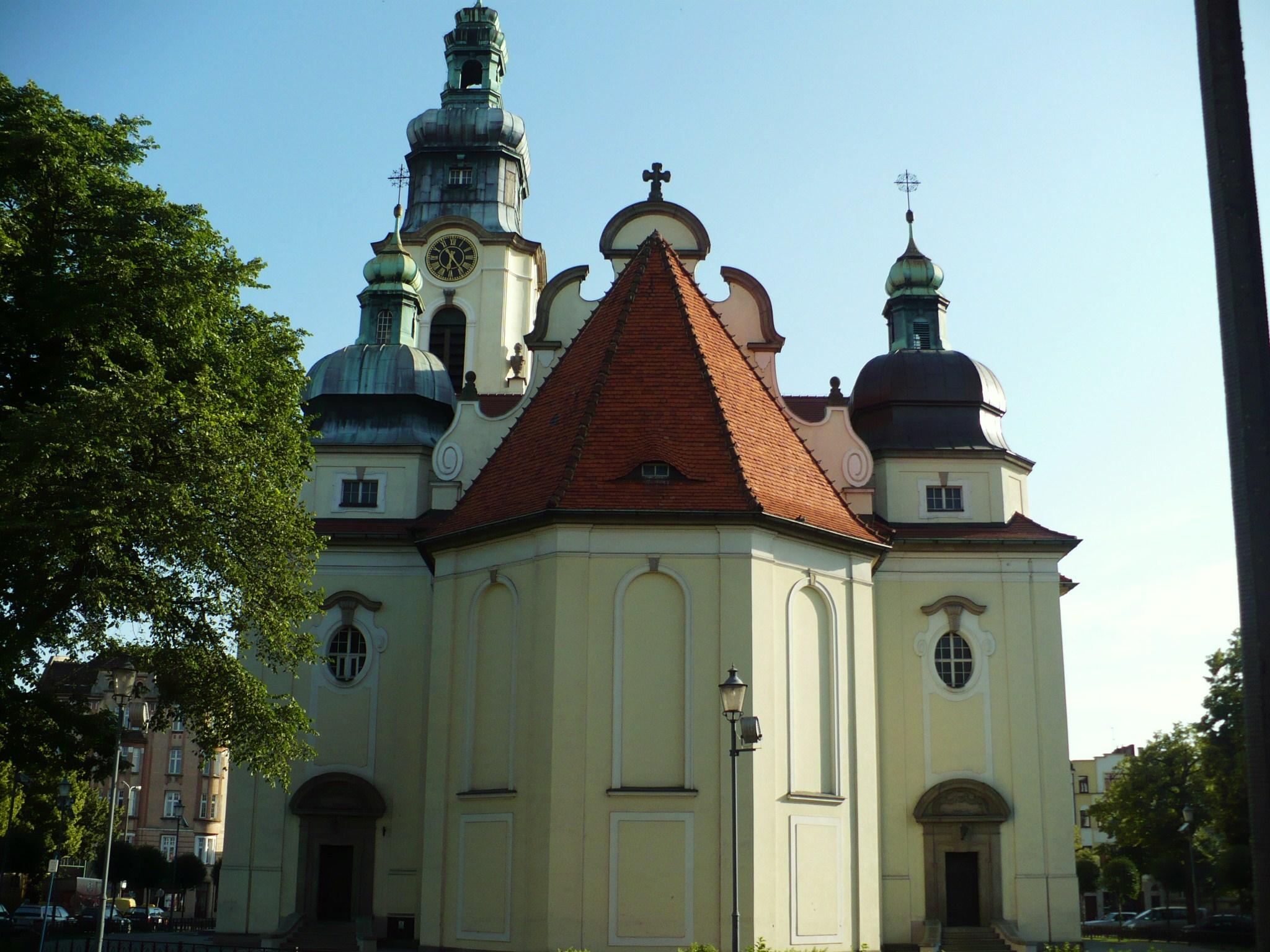
back view

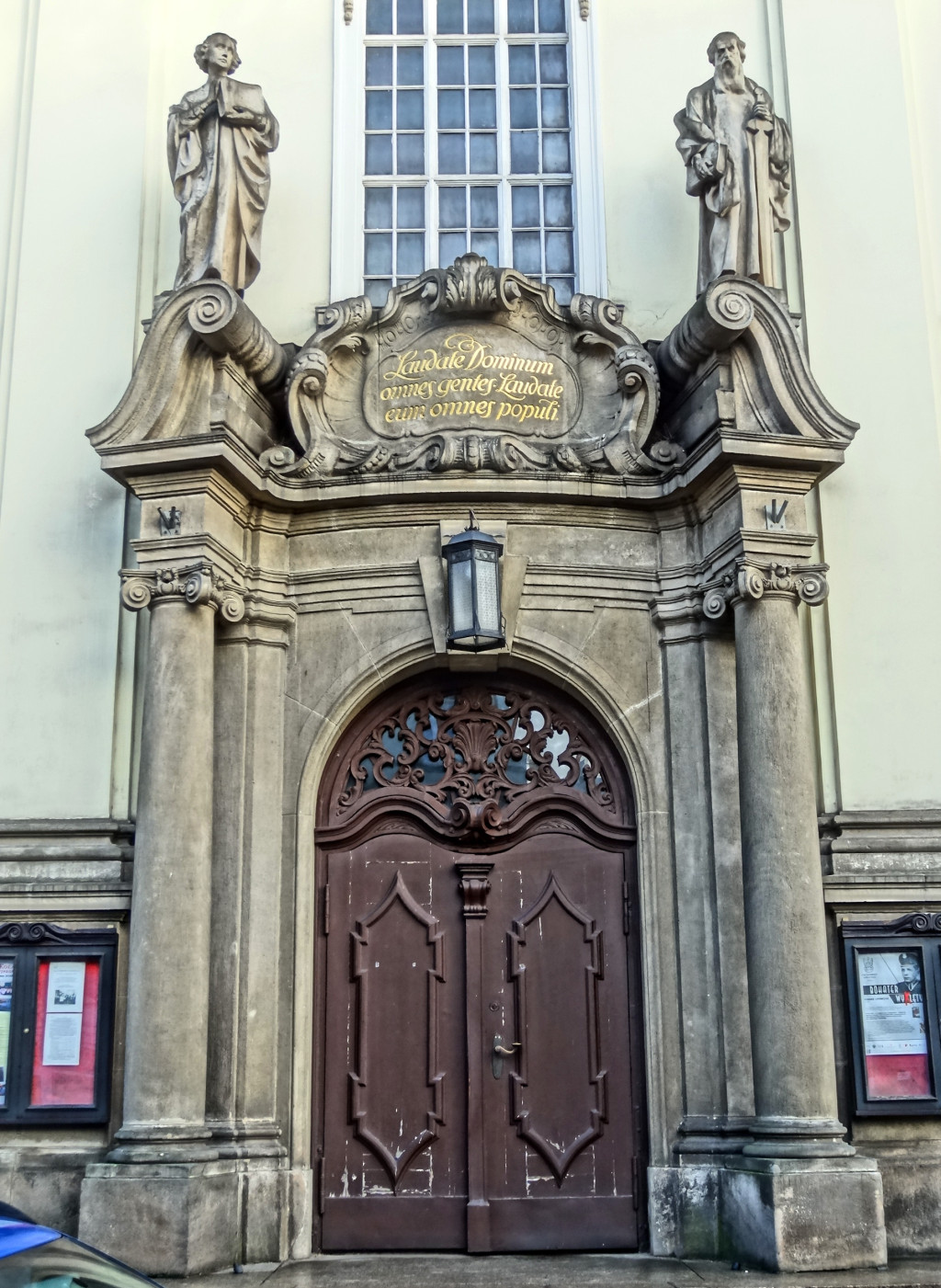
One of the main door, with Saints Peter and Paul

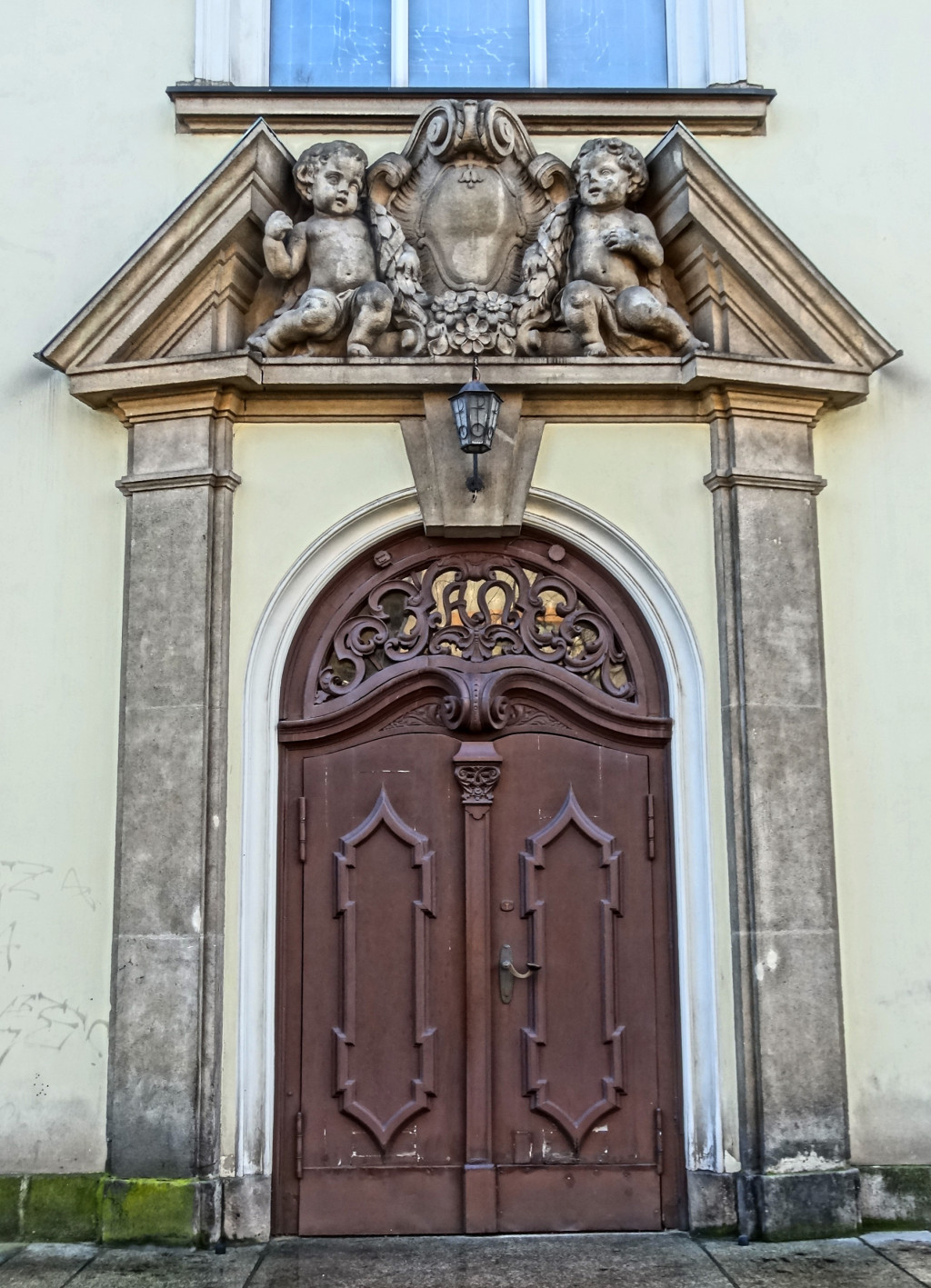
One of the facade door

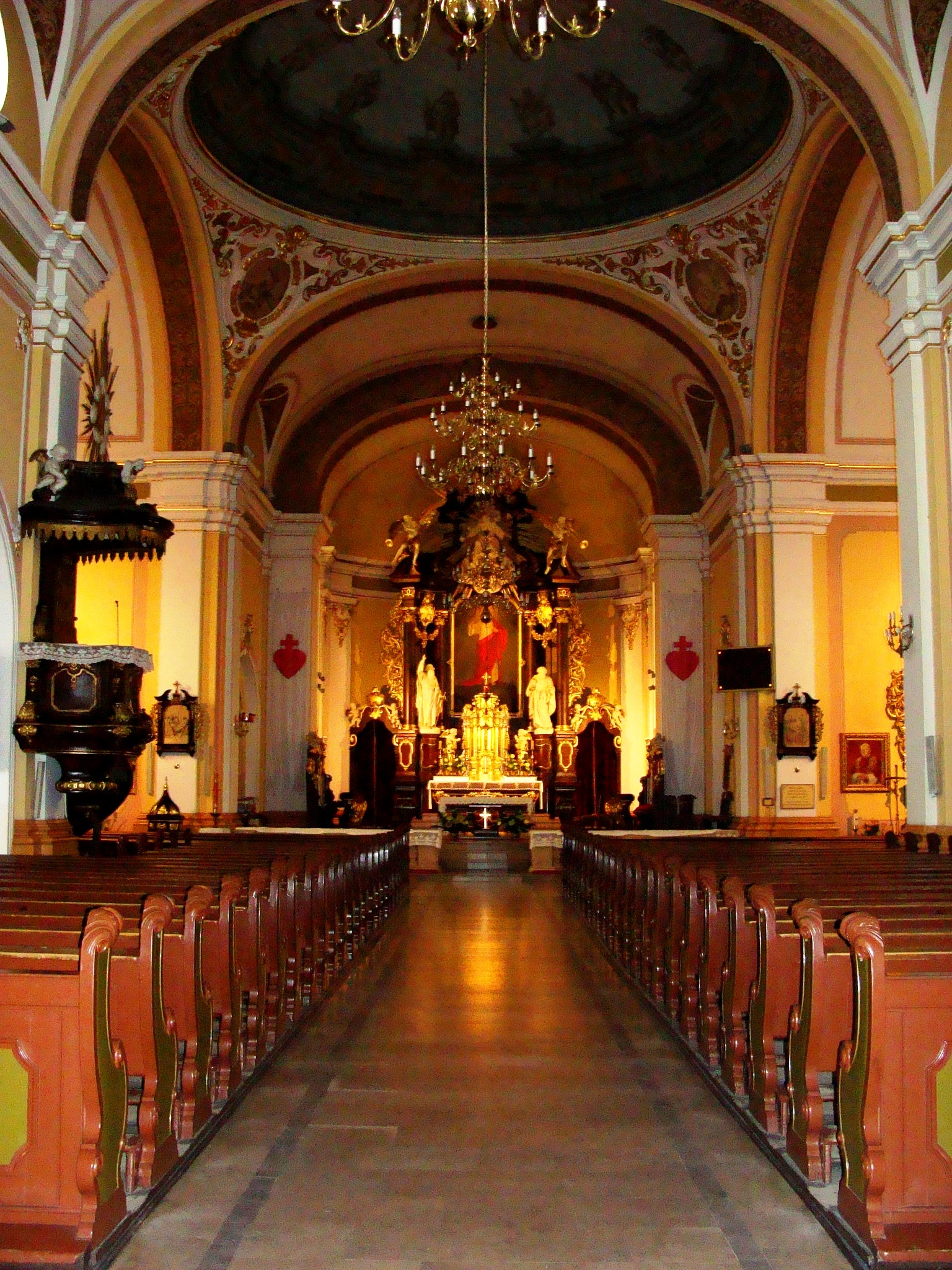
The nave

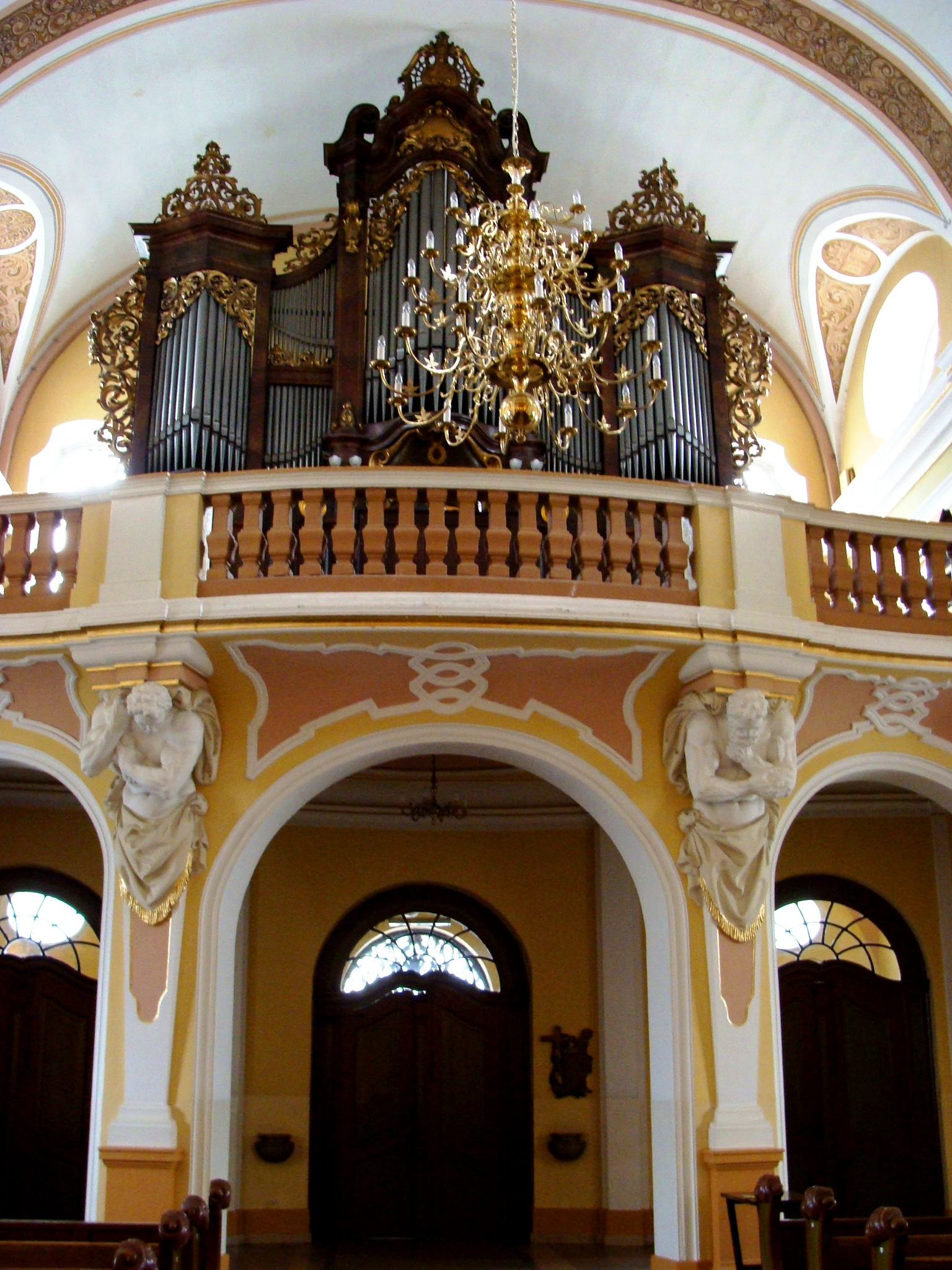
The pipe organ

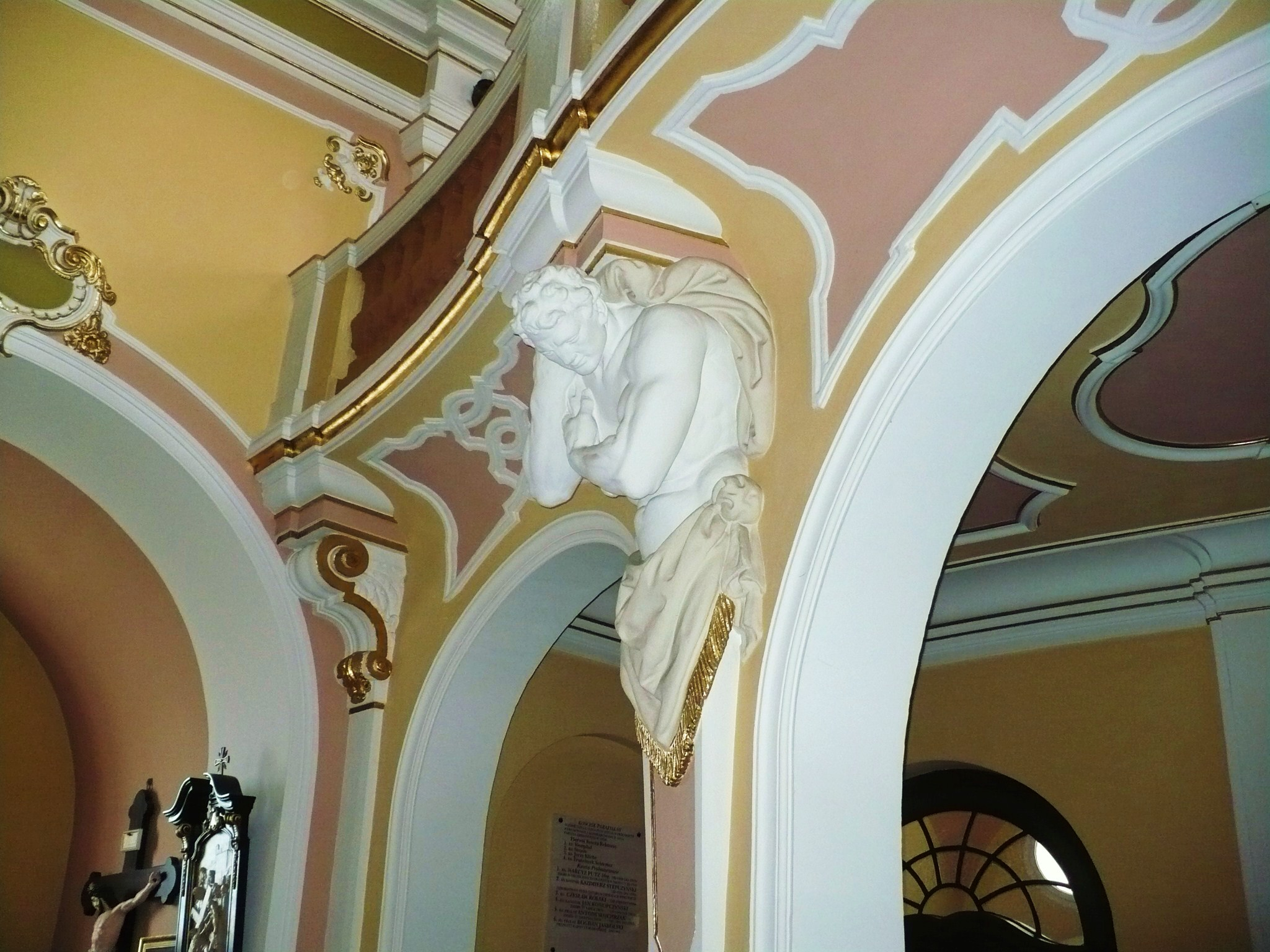
Atlant

== See also ==
- Bydgoszcz
- Paul Voelkner (Pipe organ builder)

== Bibliography ==
- Chamot, Marek (2000). Kościół katolicki w Bydgoszczy w czasie zaborów. Kalendarz Bydgoski (in Polish). Bydgoszcz: Towarzystwo Miłośników Miasta Bydgoszczy. pp. 105–110.
- Derenda, Jerzy (2006). Piękna stara Bydgoszcz – tom I z serii Bydgoszcz miasto na Kujawach. Praca zbiorowa (in Polish). Bydgoszcz: Towarzystwo Miłośników Miasta Bydgoszczy.
- Kuberska, Inga (1998). Przyczynek do badań nad obrazem "Madonna z różą" z kościoła farnego w Bydgoszczy. Materiały do dziejów kultury i sztuki Bydgoszczy i regionu, z. 3 (in Polish). Bydgoszcz: Pracownia Dokumentacji i Popularyzacji Zabytków Wojewódzkiego Ośrodka Kultury w Bydgoszczy. pp. 61–82.
- Parucka, Krystyna (2008). Zabytki Bydgoszczy: minikatalog (in Polish). Bydgoszcz: TIFEN" Krystyna Parucka. ISBN 9788392719106.
- (in Polish) Rogalski, Bogumił (1990). Architektura sakralna Bydgoszczy dawniej i dziś. Kronika Bydgoska XII (in Polish). Bydgoszcz: Towarzystwo Miłośników Miasta Bydgoszczy. pp. 51–77.
- Rudnicki, Daniel Bernard (1998). Parafia pw. Najświętszego Serca Pana Jezusa (1924-1996). Kalendarz Bydgoski (in Polish). Bydgoszcz: Towarzystwo Miłośników Miasta Bydgoszczy. pp. 205–214.
