= Tabor Church (Berlin-Wilhelmshagen) =

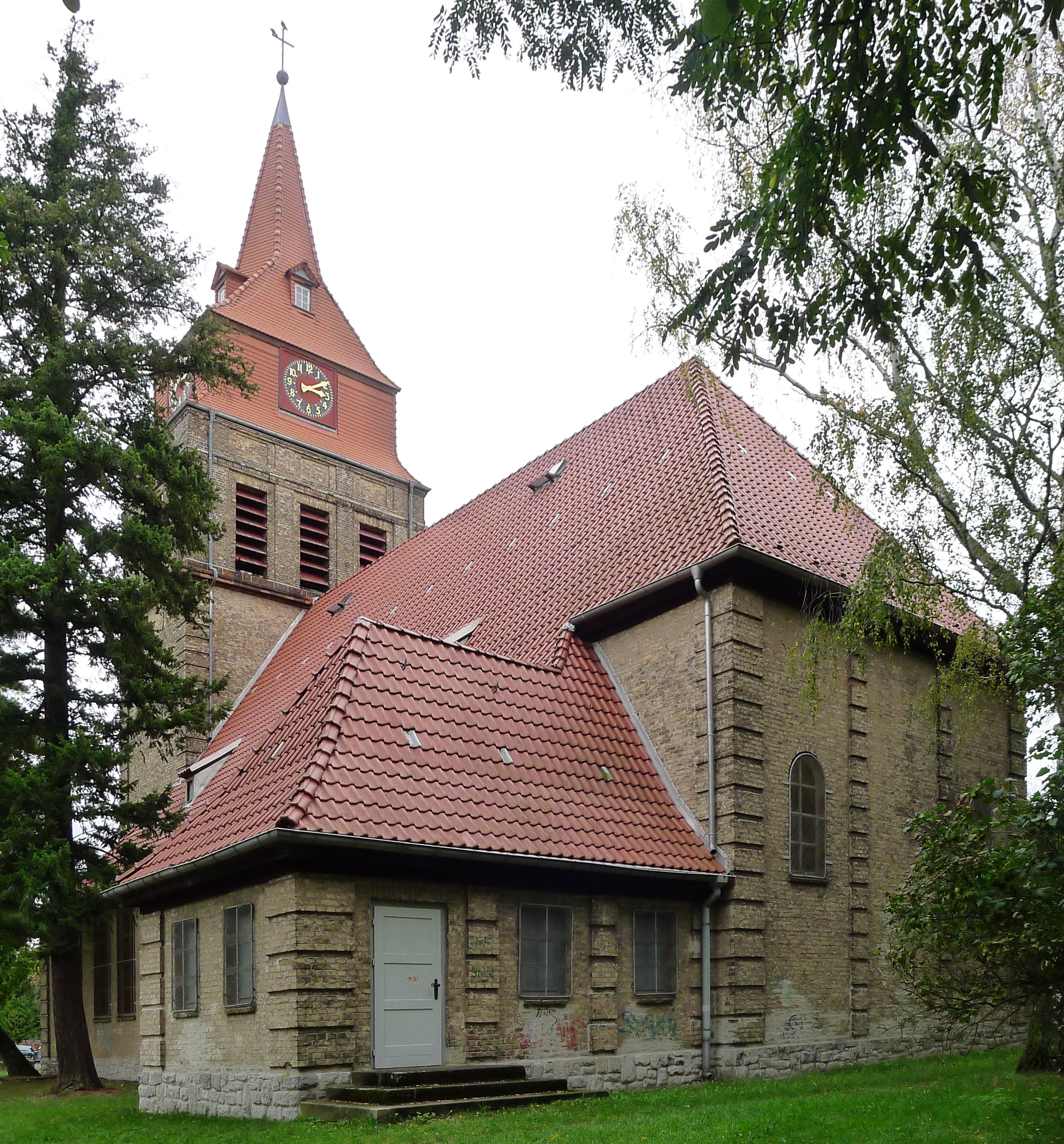
- Tabor Church, seen from southwest with the sacristy

Religion
- Affiliation: United Protestant
- District: Sprengel Berlin, Kirchenkreis Lichtenberg-Oberspree
- Province: Evangelical Church of Berlin-Brandenburg-Silesian Upper Lusatia

Location
- Location: Rahnsdorf, a locality of Berlin
- Interactive map of Tabor Church
- Coordinates: 52°26′07″N 13°42′54″E

Architecture
- Architects: Peter Jürgensen and Jürgen Bachmann
- Completed: 1911
- Materials: Brick

Tabor Church (Wilhelmshagen) (German: Tabor-Kirche) is one of the three churches of the Evangelical Berlin-Rahnsdorf Congregation, a member of today's Protestant umbrella organisation Evangelical Church of Berlin-Brandenburg-Silesian Upper Lusatia. The church building is located in the quarter Wilhelmshagen, locality Rahnsdorf, borough Treptow-Köpenick of Berlin. The church was named in memory of the Transfiguration of Jesus, which allegedly took place on Mount Tabor הר תבור in today's Israel.

== Congregation and Church ==
The congregation's parish comprises the area of the historical village of Rahnsdorf, which has been incorporated into Berlin by the Prussian Greater Berlin Act in 1920. Due to the high number of new parishioners moving in at the beginning of the 20th century the congregation decided to build an additional church in # 48, Schönblicker Straße, in the then newly developed quarter of Wilhelmshagen (today's 12589 Berlin-Wilhelmshagen).

In 1910 the congregation commissioned the architects Peter Jürgensen and Jürgen Bachmann to build the new church. On 9 April 1911 Tabor Church was inaugurated. The church is situated as a landmark in the middle of a round square, joined by streets from six directions. The quire of the church is not oriented, but directed to the south. Since baroque times church buildings are often not build according to the biblical tradition of orientation. The outside of yellow bricks is partly covered with a plaster, structured by rusticated strips of pilasters. The church consists of one nave covered by a saddle roof, drawn down to also roof the aisles. Northerly attached to the nave is a massive tower of a rectangular groundplan, topped by a squat spire, covered with shingles of slate. The building weathered the Second World War intact.

== Furnishings ==
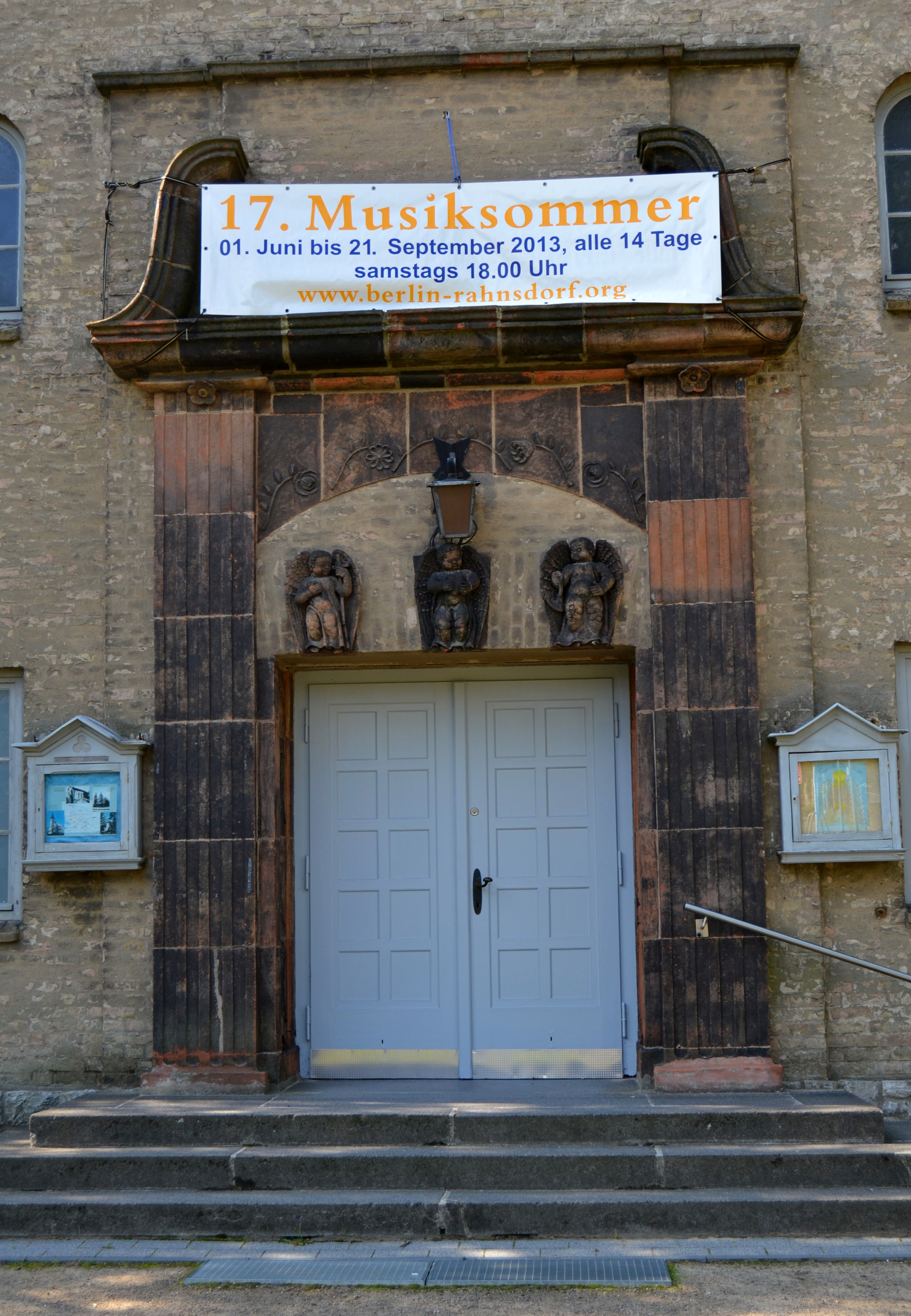
Main entrance in the tower

The main entrance in the tower is topped by a tympanon, decorated with putti symbolising the theological virtues of Faith, Love (Charity), and Hope. The nave is covered by a barrel vault. The Jugendstil furnishings by Albert Klingner comprise an altarpiece depicting the Transfiguration of Jesus (1911) and a tableau of the Four Evangelists John, Luke, Mark, and Matthew accompanied by scenes from the Old Testament.

== Putti above the entrance ==
Putti: Faith – Love – Hope

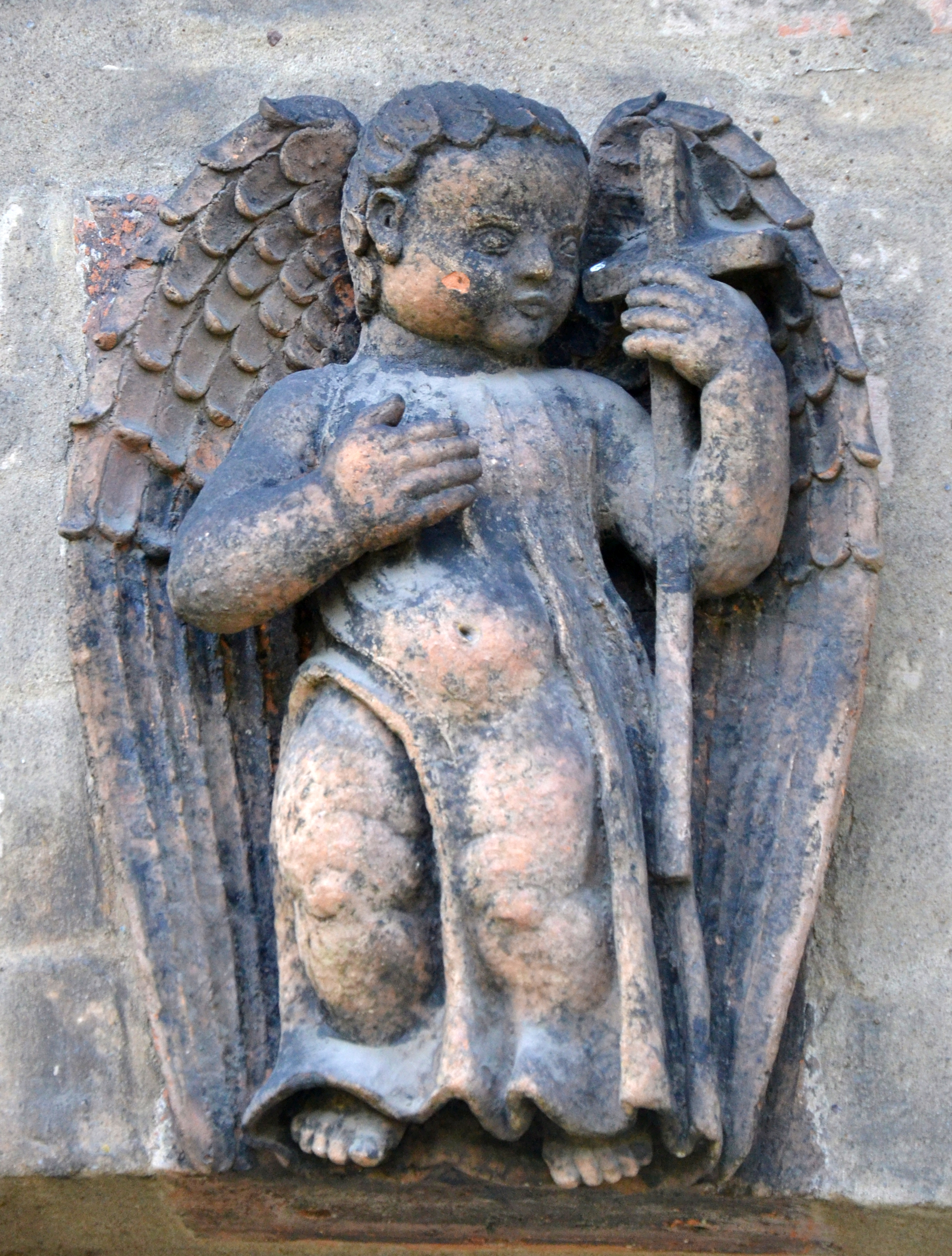
Faith

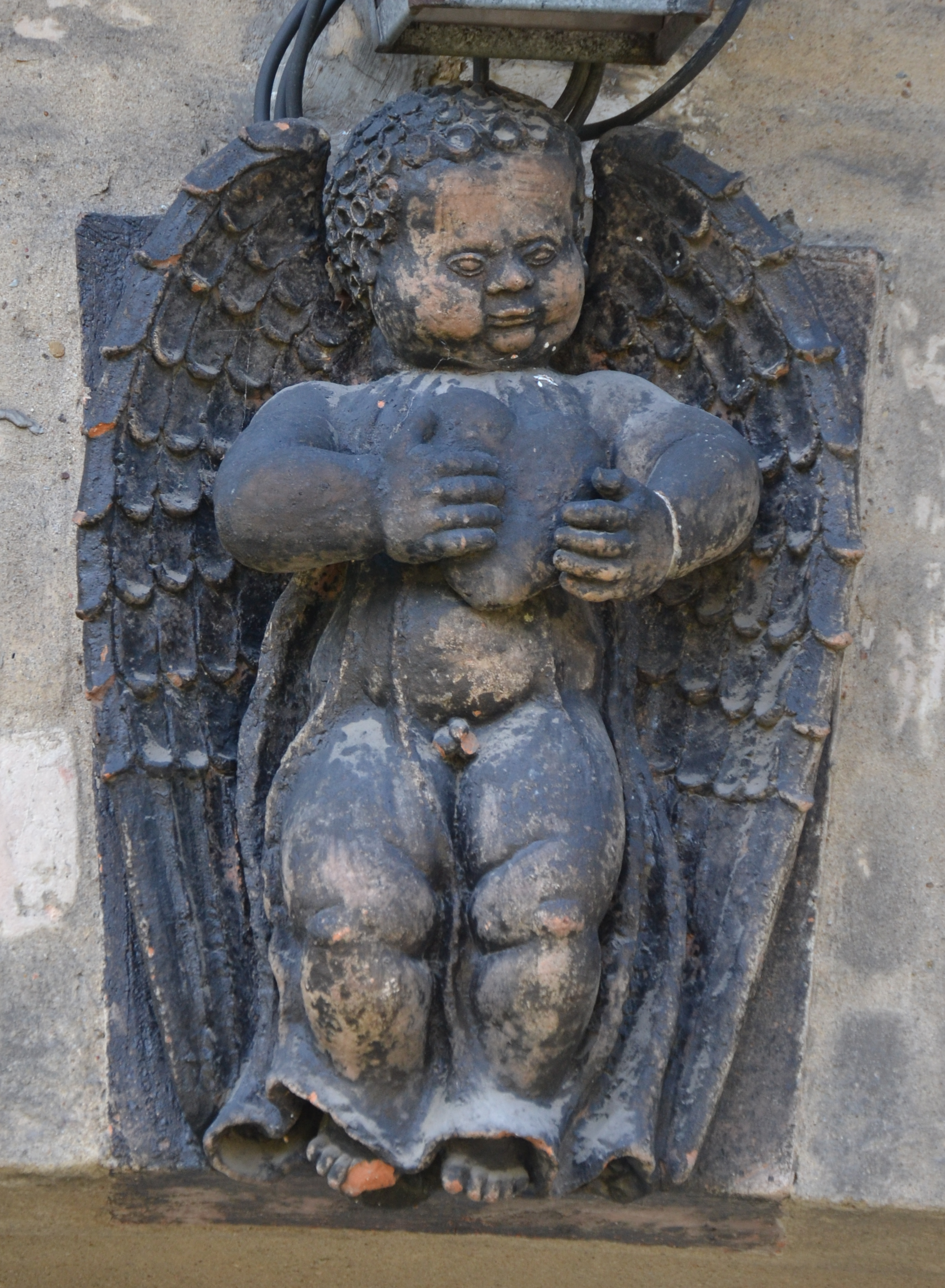
Love (Charity)

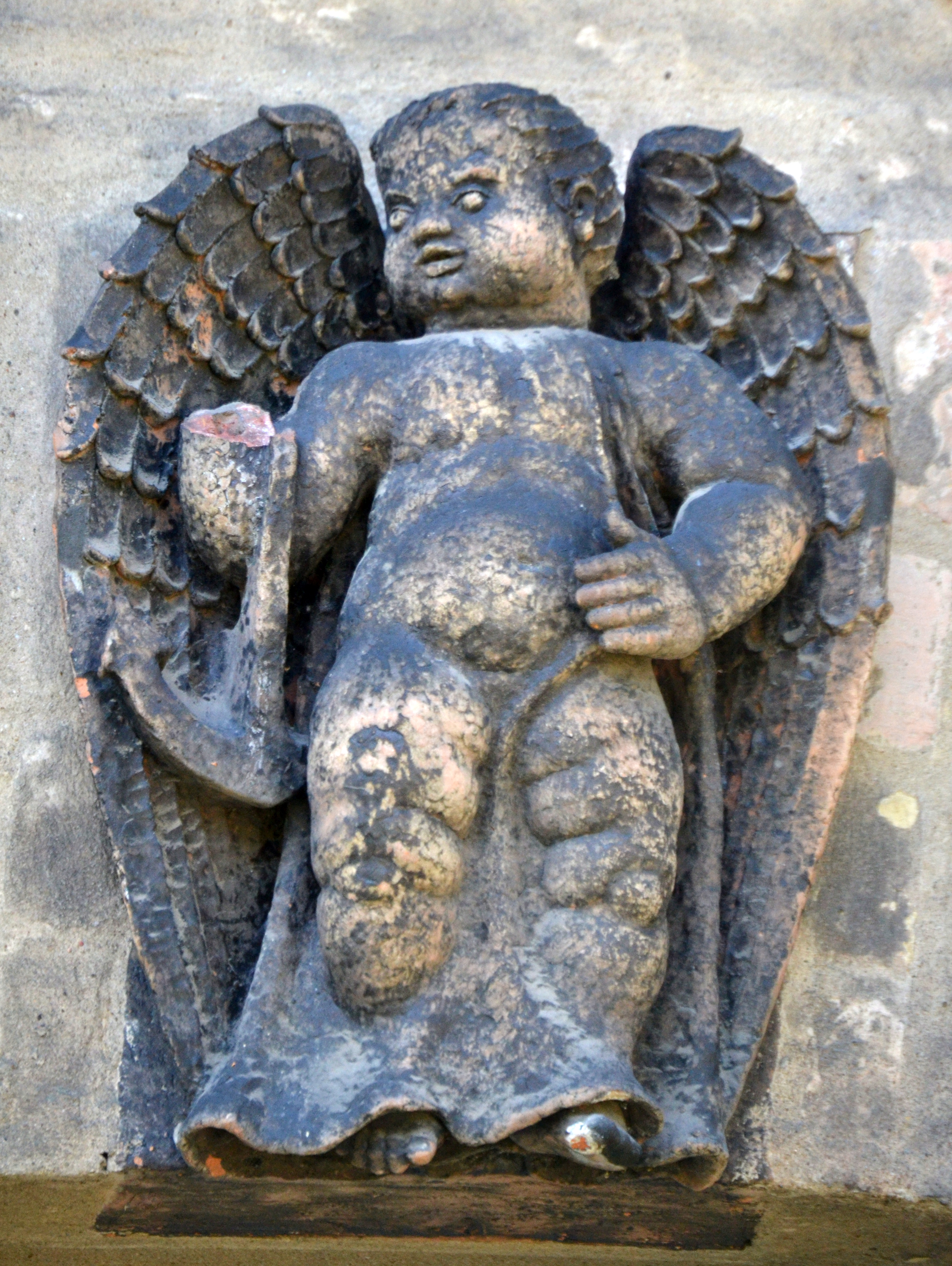
Hope
