= Charnowo, Pomeranian Voivodeship =

Charnowo
- Village
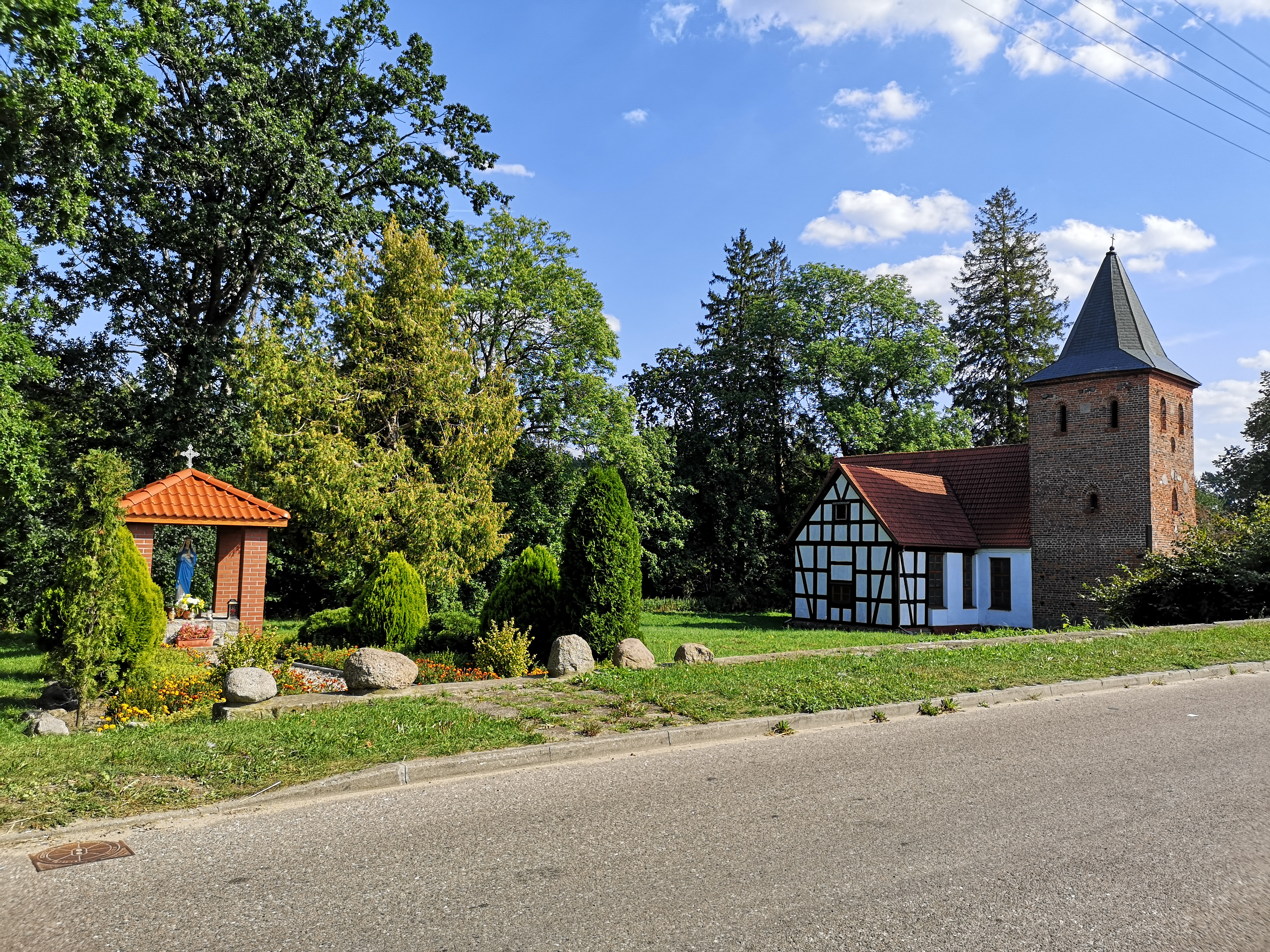

- Location within Poland
- Coordinates: 54°32′51″N 16°55′27″E
- Country: Poland
- Voivodeship: Pomeranian
- County: Słupsk
- Gmina: Ustka

Population
  - Total: 280
- Time zone: UTC+1 (CET)
  - Summer (DST): UTC+2 (CEST)
- Postal code: 76-270
- Vehicle registration: GSL

Charnowo [xarˈnɔvɔ] (German: Arnshagen) is a village in the administrative district of Gmina Ustka, within Słupsk County, Pomeranian Voivodeship, in northern Poland. It is located in the historic region of Pomerania.
