= Uwe Pape =

German organ expert (1936–2023)

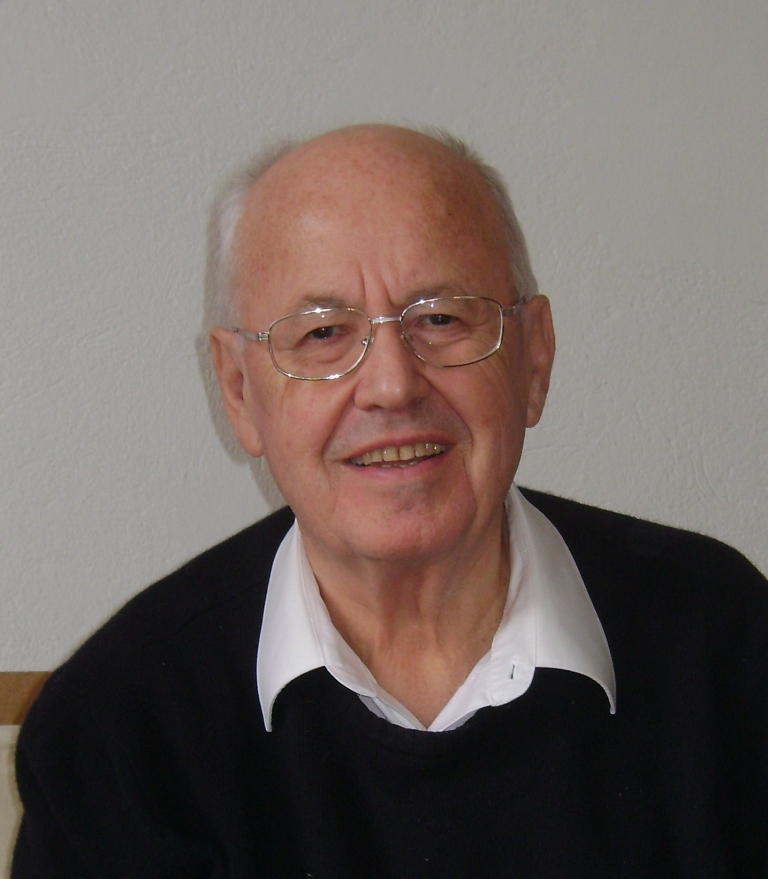
- Pape in 2013
- Born: 5 May 1937; Bremen, Germany
- Died: 13 August 2023 (aged 86); Berlin, Germany
- Education: Georg-August-Universität; TU Braunschweig
- Occupations: Business information scientist; Organ expert; Academic teacher
- Organizations: Technische Universität Berlin; Dresden University of Technology; International Association for Organ Documentation

Uwe Pape (5 May 1936 – 13 August 2023) was a German business information scientist and organ expert.

== Early life and education ==
Pape was born in Bremen. After graduating from gymnasium there, Pape studied mathematics, physics, pedagogy and philosophy at the Georg-August-Universität in Göttingen from 1955 to 1959, graduating with a diploma and a state examination. In 1965, he received his scientific doctorate in computing technology, with advisor Horst Herrmann at the TU Braunschweig, where he was a research assistant from 1959 to 1971.

== Career ==
From 1971 to 2001, Pape was professor in business informatics at the Faculty of Electrical Engineering and Computer Science at Technische Universität Berlin. He was visiting professor at the Massachusetts Institute of Technology in Cambridge in Massachusetts in 1974 and 1984/1985, at the University of Maryland, College Park in 1975, at the University of Texas at Austin in 1976, and at the University of Szczecin from 1988 to 1998. In Dresden, he developed a new faculty for traffic (Fakultät Verkehrswissenschaften) at the Dresden University of Technology, responsible for the economics course.

His research focused on optimisation methods in graphs and networks and optimisation methods in logistics, especially maritime transport logistics. A long-standing cooperation with the BLG Logistics and the Hamburger Hafen und Logistik. Publications appeared with the publishers De Gruyter, Hanser and Springer as well as in journals of operations research and applied informatic.

=== Organ expert ===
Pape had his first contact with organ building in 1953 at the Bremen Liebfrauenkirche where he was a student of Harald Wolff. During his studies he had contact with the organ builder Paul Ott. Pape began to inventory the organs of the Braunschweig Lutheran Church in 1959. In 1962, he founded a publishing house for organ building history. Pape works as a freelance organ expert for regional churches and foundations in Berlin, Bremen, Lower Saxony and Saxony. From 1985 to 2016, he led a research project on organ documentation which resulted in an organ database at the TU Berlin. Together with Paul Peeters from Gothenburg and Karl Schütz from Vienna, Pape was one of the founders of the International Association for Organ Documentation (IAOD) in 1990. He has made a significant contribution to the documentary indexing of the northern German organ landscape. Since 2000 he has been a member of the Vente Foundation (Stichting Utrecht Orgelarchief Maarten Albert Vente).

== Publications ==
=== Business ===
- with Detlef Karras, Lutz Kredel: Entwicklungsumgebungen für Expertensysteme. Vergleichende Darstellung ausgewählter Systeme. de Gruyter, Berlin among others 1987, ISBN 3-11-011294-9.
- with T. Frauenstein, O. Wagner: Objektorientierte Sprachkonzepte und diskrete Simulation : Klassifikation, Vergleich und Bewertung von Konzepten der Programmiersprachen Simula 67, Modula 2, Pascal, Smalltalk 80 und Beta aus objektorientierter Sicht vor dem Hintergrund des Anwendungsgebietes der diskreten Simulation. Springer, Berlin among others 1990, ISBN 3-540-53288-9.

=== History of organ building ===
Monographs and essays

- with Karl Heinz Bielefeld: Friedrich Werder – August von Werder. Orgelbauer in Elliehausen und Höckelheim. (Norddeutsche Orgelbauer und ihre Werke. Vol. 10). Pape, Berlin 2017, ISBN 978-3-921140-20-8.
- Organographia Historica Hildesiensis. Orgeln und Orgelbauer in Hildesheim. Pape, Berlin 2014, ISBN 978-3-921140-93-2.
- with Georg Schloetmann: 175 Jahre Emil Hammer Orgelbau. Pape, Berlin 2013, ISBN 978-3-921140-91-8.
- Ernst Palandt, E. Palandt & Sohnle, Hildesheimer Orgelbauwerkstatt. Norddeutsche Orgelbauer und ihre Werke. Vol. 8. Berlin: Pape. 2011. ISBN 978-3-92-114089-5.
- Heinrich Schaper, August Schaper. Norddeutsche Orgelbauer und ihre Werke. Vol. 6. Berlin: Pape. 2009. ISBN 978-3-92-114082-6.
- Die Orgeln des Herzogtums Braunschweig vor 1810. Acta Organologica. Vol. 30. 2008. pp. 89–242.
- Orgelbauerfamilie Boden in Helmstedt und Halberstadt. Norddeutsche Orgelbauer und ihre Werke. Vol. 4. Berlin: Pape. 2006. ISBN 3-921140-69-2.
- Roland Behrens; Christoph Grohmann, eds. (2005). Carl Giesecke – Orgelbauer und Fabrikant von Zungenstimmen in Göttingen. Dulce Melos Organorum. Festschrift Alfred Reichling zum 70. Geburtstag. Mettlach: Gesellschaft der Orgelfreunde. pp. 385–422.
- with Alfred Schirge (2005). Die Orgelbauerfamilie Papenius und ihre Schüler. Norddeutsche Orgelbauer und ihre Werke. Vol. 3. Berlin: Pape. ISBN 3-921140-68-4.
- Historische Orgeln in Brandenburg und Berlin. Berlin: Pape. 2004. ISBN 3-921140-65-X.
- Orgeln in Berlin. Berlin: Pape. 2003. ISBN 3-921140-62-5.
- with Winfried Topp (2003). Orgeln und Orgelbauer in Bremen (3rd ed.). Berlin: Pape. ISBN 3-921140-64-1.
- Norddeutsche Orgelbauer und ihre Werke. Norddeutsche Orgeln. Vol. 2. Berlin: Pape. 2001. ISBN 3-921140-54-4.
- Die Orgeln der Stadt Celle. Norddeutsche Orgeln. Berlin: Pape. 2000. ISBN 3-921140-55-2.
- Alfred Reichling, ed. (1995). Paul Ott – Protagonist des Baus von Schleifladenorgeln zwischen den beiden Weltkriegen. Aspekte der Orgelbewegung. Berlin, Kassel: Merseburger. pp. 263–298. ISBN 3-87537-261-1.
- Die Orgeln der Stadt Bremen. Ein Auszug aus der Datenbank Berlin. Berlin: Pape. 1994. ISBN 3-921140-43-9.
- The Tracker Organ Revival in America = Die Orgelbewegung in Amerika. Veröffentlichung der Gesellschaft der Orgelfreunde. Berlin: Pape. 1977. ISBN 3-921140-16-1.
- Philipp Furtwängler (1800–1867) – Orgelbauer in Elze bei Hannover. Vol. 11. 1974. pp. 777–798.
- Die Orgeln der Stadt Wolfenbüttel. Norddeutsche Orgeln. Wolfenbüttel: Pape. 1973. ISBN 3-921140-11-0.
- Die Orgeln des Landkreises Braunschweig. Norddeutsche Orgeln. Wolfenbüttel: Pape. 1968. ISBN 3-921140-07-2.
- Die Orgeln der Stadt Braunschweig. Norddeutsche Orgeln. Wolfenbüttel: Pape. 1966. ISBN 3-921140-04-8.
- Articles: Buchholz, Carl August; Führer, Alfred; Furtwängler, Familie; Giesecke, Familie; Gloger, Familie; Grüneberg, Familie; Lütkemüller, Friedrich Hermann; Reubke, Familie; Röver, Familie; Scherer, Familie; Schuke, Familie. In Die Musik in Geschichte und Gegenwart. Kassel, Bärenreiter 1999–2007.

Editor

- Wolfram Hackel; Christhard Kirchner, eds. (2017). "Berlin, Brandenburg und Umgebung". Lexikon norddeutscher Orgelbauer. Vol. 4. Berlin: Pape. ISBN 978-3-92-114006-2.
- Wolfram Hackel, ed. (2015). "Sachsen-Anhalt und Umgebung". Lexikon norddeutscher Orgelbauer. Vol. 3. Berlin: Pape. ISBN 978-3-92-114098-7.
- Wolfram Hackel, ed. (2012). "Sachsen und Umgebung". Lexikon norddeutscher Orgelbauer. Vol. 2. Berlin: Pape. ISBN 978-3-92-114092-5.
- "Thüringen und Umgebung". Lexikon norddeutscher Orgelbauer. Vol. 1. Berlin: Pape. 2009. ISBN 978-3-921140-86-4.
- Die Orgeln im St. Petri Dom zu Bremen. Berlin: Pape. 2002. ISBN 3-921140-56-0.
- Das Werkstattbuch des Orgelbauers Christian Vater. Quellen zur Geschichte der Stadt Hannover. Berlin: Pape. 2001. ISBN 3-921140-60-9.
- Restaurierung pneumatischer Orgeln. Tagungsbericht der IAOD-Tagung über die Restaurierung pneumatischer Orgeln im August 1993 in Berlin. Berlin: Pape. 1995. ISBN 3-921140-46-3.
- Berthold Schwarz, ed. (1991). 500 Jahre Orgeln in Berliner Evangelischen Kirchen. Veröffentlichung der Gesellschaft der Orgelfreunde. Berlin: Pape. ISBN 3-921140-34-X.
