= Duninowo =

- Village
- Location within Poland
- Coordinates: 54°32′N 16°49′E
- Country: Poland
- Voivodeship: Pomeranian
- County: Słupsk
- Gmina: Ustka
- Population: 630

Duninowo [duniˈnɔvɔ] (German: Dünnow) is a village in the administrative district of Gmina Ustka, within Słupsk County, Pomeranian Voivodeship, in northern Poland.

For the history of the region, see History of Pomerania.
