= List of shipwrecks in March 1849 =

The list of shipwrecks in March 1849 includes ships sunk, foundered, wrecked, grounded, or otherwise lost during March 1849.

== 1 March ==
List of shipwrecks: 1 March 1849
Ship	State	Description
Admiral Bingham	United Kingdom	The schooner was driven ashore at Redcar, Yorkshire. She was refloated and put in to Whitby, Yorkshire.
Bernard	Belgium	The ship foundered 40 nautical miles (74 km) off the English coast. Her crew were rescued. She was on a voyage from Ostend, West Flanders to London, United Kingdom.
Betsey	United Kingdom	The ship was driven ashore at Red Castle, Forfarshire. She was on a voyage from Warkworth, Northumberland to Montrose, Forfarshire.
Boston	United States	The packet ship was wrecked on the east coast of the United States with the loss of fifteen lives. She was on a voyage from Liverpool, Lancashire, United Kingdom to the United States.
Brothers	United Kingdom	The ship was driven ashore near Banff, Aberdeenshire. Her crew were rescued. She was on a voyage from Aberdeen to Lossiemouth, Lothian.
Camel	United Kingdom	The sloop sprang a leak and foundered in the North Sea off Redheugh, Northumberland. Her crew were rescued. She was on a voyage from Newcastle upon Tyne, Northumberland to Saint Andrews, Fife.
Castletown	(United Kingdom of Great Britain and Ireland) Isle of Man	The ship was driven ashore and wrecked at Whitehaven, Cumberland. Her crew were rescued. She was on a voyage from Liverpool, Lancashire to Whitehaven.
Ceres	United Kingdom	The ship ran aground at Lowestoft, Suffolk. She was refloated.
Colchester	United Kingdom	The ship was wrecked on Socotra. Her crew were rescued. She was on a voyage from Aden to Moulmein, Burma.
Elizabeth and Ann	United Kingdom	The ship was abandoned in the Atlantic Ocean 10 leagues (30 nautical miles (56 km)) south south west of the Isles of Scilly with the loss of a crew member. She was on a voyage from Alexandria, Egypt to Stockton-on-Tees, County Durham.
Emulation	United Kingdom	The derelict schooner was driven ashore near Aberdyfi, Cardiganshire. She was later refloated and towed in to Barmouth, Caernarfonshire.
Franklin	United States	The ship was wrecked at Wellfleet, Massachusetts with the loss of six lived. She was on a voyage from London to Boston, Massachusetts.
Harwood	United Kingdom	The schooner capsized and sank with the loss of all but four of her crew. Survivors were rescued by the brig Wansbeck (United Kingdom). Harwood was on a voyage from Marstrand, Sweden to London.
Margaret and Rachael	United Kingdom	The ship was driven ashore at Holyhead, Anglesey. She was on a voyage from Liverpool, Lancashire to Dublin.
Shincliffe	United Kingdom	The ship was driven ashore at Boulmer, Northumberland. She was refloated.
Trio	United Kingdom	The collier, a brig, sank off the North Foreland, Kent.
Tulliallan	United Kingdom	The ship sank near Dunmore. She was refloated on 10 March.

== 2 March ==
List of shipwrecks: 2 March 1849
Ship	State	Description
Andromeda	United Kingdom	The ship was driven ashore at Odesa.
Betsey	United Kingdom	The ship was wrecked in Lanan Bay. Her crew were rescued. She was on a voyage from Warkworth, Northumberland to Leith, Lothian.
Celine and Amelia	France	The brig was wrecked at Selsey, Sussex, United Kingdom.
Ceres	Bremen	The ship ran aground and was damaged. She was on a voyage from Bremen to an English port. She was refloated and put back to Bremen.
Constantia	United Kingdom	The ship departed from Hamburg for Hull, Yorkshire. Presumed subsequently foundered with the loss of all hands; a boat washed up at Wyk auf Föhr, Duchy of Holstein.
Elf	United Kingdom	The ship was driven ashore by ice at Galaţi, Ottoman Empire.
Mary Ann	United Kingdom	The ship was driven ashore at Hook of Holland, South Holland, Netherlands. Her crew were rescued. She was on a voyage from Rotterdam, South Holland to Newhaven, Sussex.
Riga	United States	The ship caught fire and was abandoned. She was on a voyage from Savannah, Georgia to New York.
Shamrock	United Kingdom	The ship was driven ashore in Lough Swilly. She was on a voyage from Liverpool, Lancashire to the Rio Grande. She was refloated and taken in to Rathmullan, County Down.
Six	United Kingdom	The ship ran aground on the Herd Sand, in the North Sea off the coast of County Durham. She was refloated and towed in the South Shields, County Durham with the assistance of two steamships.

== 3 March ==
List of shipwrecks: 3 March 1849
Ship	State	Description
Astrea	Bremen	The ship was wrecked on the Witt Sand. Her crew were rescued. She was on a voyage from an English port to Bremen.
Hendrika	Denmark	The galiot was wrecked in Sandy Bay, Gibraltar. She was on a voyage from Cette, Hérault, France to Helsingør.
John Callum	United Kingdom	The brig was in collision with another vessel and was abandoned 12 nautical miles (22 km) north west by west of Bardsey Island, Pembrokeshire. She was discovered by Susan (United Kingdom), which put a skeleton crew on board. They took her in to Holyhead, Anglesey the next day.
Nautilus	United Kingdom	The ship sank at Heligoland. Her crew were rescued. She was on a voyage from Newcastle upon Tyne, Northumberland to Hamburg.
Olympus	United Kingdom	The barque was driven ashore at Livorno, Grand Duchy of Tuscany. She was refloated.
Sarah	United Kingdom	The ship collided with Hero (United Kingdom) and foundered in the North Sea off the coast of Yorkshire. Her crew were rescued. She was on a voyage from Sunderland, County Durham to Ipswich, Suffolk.
Tour d'Auvergne	France	The ship was wrecked on the coast of Patagonia, Argentina with the loss of nine of her crew.
Weatherley	United Kingdom	The brig ran aground on the Middle Ground. She was refloated and towed back to South Shields, County Durham.
William and George	United Kingdom	The ship ran aground at the mouth of the Orne and was damaged.

== 4 March ==
List of shipwrecks: 4 March 1849
Ship	State	Description
Elizabeth	United Kingdom	The ship sprang a leak and was beached at Plymouth, Devon. She was on a voyage from Sunderland, County Durham to New York, United States.
Gordon	United Kingdom	The sloop struck a sunken wreck and sank off the East Hoyle Bank, in Liverpool Bay. Her crew were rescued. She was on a voyage from Liverpool, Lancashire to Bangor.
Louisa Caroline	United Kingdom	The ship was wrecked on the Falsterbo Reef, in the Baltic Sea. She was on a voyage from Newcastle upon Tyne, Northumberland to Swinemünde, Prussia.
Nimrod	Belgium	The ship was driven ashore at the Rammekens Castle, Zeeland, Netherlands.
Olga	Hamburg	The ship was driven ashore on Spiekeroog, Kingdom of Hanover. Her crew were rescued. She was on a voyage from Rio de Janeiro, Brazil to Hamburg.
Princess Royal	United Kingdom	The transport ship ran aground off Grenada. She was refloated.
William	(United Kingdom of Great Britain and Ireland) New South Wales	The brig struck a sunken rock in the Tamar River and became waterlogged. She was on a voyage from Launceston, Van Diemen's Land to Sydney.

== 5 March ==
List of shipwrecks: 5 March 1849
Ship	State	Description
Albert	United Kingdom	The paddle steamer struck the pier at Alloa, Clackmannanshire and sank. She was on a voyage from Alloa to Grantown-on-Spey, Moray.
Eglantine	United Kingdom	The brig ran aground near Redcar, Yorkshire. She was refloated.
Janet	United Kingdom	The ship ran aground on a sunken rock in the Sound of Islay and was damaged. She was on a voyage from Liverpool, Lancashire to South Shields, County Durham. She was refloated the next day and taken in to White Farlane Bay.

== 6 March ==
List of shipwrecks: 6 March 1849
Ship	State	Description
Curlew	United Kingdom	The ship ran aground near Bremen. She was refloated and taken in to Cuxhaven.
Ismail	France	The brig was abandoned in the Irish Sea off the Crow Rock. She was on a voyage from Troon, Ayrshire, United Kingdom to a French port. She was taken in to Swansea, Glamorgan, United Kingdom.
Superior	United Kingdom	The whaler was driven ashore and wrecked at Kirkwall, Orkney Islands. She was on a voyage from Peterhead, Aberdeenshire to Greenland.
Wansbeck	United Kingdom	The brig was driven ashore at "Vige", Norway. She was on a voyage from Gothenburg, Sweden to Newcastle upon Tyne, Northumberland.
Wilhelm	Russia	The schooner was sunk by ice at Cape Magnusholm. Her crew were rescued. She was on a voyage from Lisbon, Portugal to Bolderāja.

== 7 March ==
List of shipwrecks: 7 March 1849
Ship	State	Description
Britannia	United Kingdom	The paddle steamer was damaged by fire at Leith, Lothian. She was on a voyage from Leith to Newcastle upon Tyne, Northumberland.
Caledonia	United Kingdom	The ship was driven ashore and wrecked on Horse Isle, in the Firth of Forth with the loss of all but two of her crew. She was on a voyage from Liverpool, Lancashire to Londonderry.
Equity	United Kingdom	The schooner ran aground on the Owers Sandbank, in the English Channel. She was on a voyage from South Shields, County Durham to Gibraltar. She was refloated and put in to Shoreham-by-Sea, Sussex.
Morning Star	United Kingdom	The ship sank off Newton, Berwickshire. Her crew were rescued. She was on a voyage from Middlesbrough, Yorkshire to Port Dundas, Renfrewshire.
Simpson	United Kingdom	The ship was driven ashore near Lytham St. Annes, Lancashire. She was on a voyage from Wexford to Preston, Lancashire.
Stella	United Kingdom	The brig departed from South Shields for Hamburg. Presumed foundered with the loss of all hands; a log book and part of a chest from the vessel were discovered off Borkum, Kingdom of Hanover in mid-April.
Victory	United Kingdom	The ship struck a sunken rock at "Kanso", Sweden and was damaged. She was on a voyage from Hull, Yorkshire to Gothenburg, Sweden. She was refloated and towed in to Gotheburgh.

== 8 March ==
List of shipwrecks: 8 March 1849
Ship	State	Description
Busick	United Kingdom	The brig ran aground on the Barber Sand, in the North Sea off the coast of Norfolk. She was on a voyage from Sunderland, County Durham to Folkestone, Kent. She was refloated and put in to Great Yarmouth, Norfolk in a leaky condition.
Gleam	United Kingdom	The ship ran aground on the Outer Barber Sand, in the North Sea off the coast of Norfolk. She was on a voyage from Crail, Fife to London. She was refloated and taken in to Great Yarmouth, Norfolk.
Petit Pierre	France	The ship struck a sunken wreck and foundered off the Kentish Knock, Her crew were rescued. She was on a voyage from London to Hartlepool, County Durham, United Kingdom.

== 9 March ==
List of shipwrecks: 9 March 1849
Ship	State	Description
Adele	France	The ship was wrecked on the Borkimmer Reef. Her crew were rescued. She was on a voyage from Havre de Grâce, Seine-Inférieure to Bremen.
Cate	Austrian Empire	The barque ran aground in the Victoria Channel and was abandoned by her crew, who were rescued by the Mersey Ferry Birkenhead (United Kingdom). Cate was on a voyage from Liverpool, Lancashire, United Kingdom to Trieste. She was subsequently wrecked on the East Hoyle Bank, in Liverpool Bay.
Hazelwood	United Kingdom	The ship ran aground on the Herd Sand, in the North Sea off the coast of County Durham. She was refloated but drove ashore near South Shields, County Durham. Her crew were rescued. She was again refloated on 14 March.
Jean Bruneau	France	The schooner ran aground on the Bantry Bank, in Liverpool Bay. She was refloated but consequently sank off the Formby Lightship ( Trinity House). Her crew were rescued by the tug President (United Kingdom). Jean Bruneau was on a voyage from Ayr, United Kingdom to Liverpool.
Joseph and Mary	United Kingdom	The schooner sprang a leak and foundered in The Wash off Snettisham, Norfolk. Her crew were rescued by X. L. (United Kingdom). Joseph and Mary was on a voyage from London to Sunderland, County Durham. She was refloated on 13 March and taken in to King's Lynn, Norfolk.
Mermede	Netherlands	The ship was driven ashore near Hellevoetsluis, Zeeland. She was on a voyage from Hellevoetsluis to Liverpool. She was refloated and put back to Hellevoetsluis.
Newport	United Kingdom	The ship struck the pier and sank at Bridlington, Yorkshire. She was on a voyage from London to Montrose, Forfarshire.
Supply	United Kingdom	The ship foundered in the North Sea 120 nautical miles (220 km) west of Lindesnes, Norway. Her ten crew were rescued by the sloop Laura (Denmark). Supply was on a voyage from Newcastle upon Tyne, Northumberland to Swinemünde, Prussia.

== 10 March ==
List of shipwrecks: 10 March 1849
Ship	State	Description
Æolus	United States	The ship was wrecked on the Stirrup Key. She was on a voyage from Cádiz, Spain to New Orleans, Louisiana.
Helen S. Page	United States	The ship was driven ashore between the mouths of the Guadarranque and Pamones. She was on a voyage from Boston, Massachusetts to Genoa, Kingdom of Sardinia. She was later refloated and taken in to Gibraltar Bay.
Queen	United Kingdom	The ship struck the Crow Rock and was damaged. She was on a voyage from Cardiff, Glamorgan to Liverpool, Lancashire. She put in to Milford Haven, Pembrokeshire.
Sylphe	France	The brig was wrecked near Tétouan, Morocco. Her crew were rescued. She was on a voyage form Tétouan to Marseille, Bouches-du-Rhône.
Voyager	United Kingdom	The ship ran aground off "Toto", Sweden and was damaged. She was on a voyage from Leith, Lothian to a Baltic port. She was refloated and taken in to "Kanso", Sweden for repairs.
William Penn	United Kingdom	The schooner ran aground on the Jordan Flats, in Liverpool Bay. She was refloated but was wrecked on the Burbo Bank with the loss of three of her five crew. She was on a voyage from Liverpool to Youghal, County Cork.

== 11 March ==
List of shipwrecks: 11 March 1849
Ship	State	Description
Five Sostre	Denmark	The ship ran aground on the Tangen Ground, in the North Sea. She was on a voyage from Rudkøbing to Newcastle upon Tyne, Northumberland, United Kingdom. She was refloated on 13 March and put in to Nyborg.
Venus	United Kingdom	The schooner was abandoned off Waterford. She was towed in to Milford Haven, Pembrokeshire on 17 March by James (United Kingdom).

== 12 March ==
List of shipwrecks: 12 March 1849
Ship	State	Description
Acadia	Reichsflotte	The paddle steamer was driven ashore on Terschelling, Friesland, Netherlands. She was on a voyage from Liverpool, Lancashire, United Kingdom to Bremen. She was refloated the next day and taken in to Terschelling.
Diana	United Kingdom	The brig ran aground on the Holm Sand, in the North Sea off the coast of Suffolk. She was refloated.
Diana	Denmark	The ship was wrecked off Falkenburg, Sweden. She was on a voyage from Newcastle upon Tyne, Northumberland, United Kingdom to Memel, Prussia.
M. A. Scott	United Kingdom	The ship was run into by the steamship Citizen (United Kingdom) and sank at Dublin.
Westa	Flag unknown	The ship was severely damaged off Cape Finisterre, Spain by an onboard explosion in her cargo of coal. A crew member was killed and three were severely injured. She was on a voyage from Cardiff, Glamorgan, United Kingdom to Barcelona, Spain. She put in to Cádiz, Spain, where she arrived on 18 March.

== 13 March ==
List of shipwrecks: 13 March 1849
Ship	State	Description
Diana	Denmark	The koff ran aground between Båstad and Laholm, Sweden.
Thomas and Ann	United Kingdom	The ship sprang a leak and was beached at Chapel St. Leonards, Lincolnshire. She was on a voyage from Hull, Yorkshire to Wisbech, Cambridgeshire.
Wimbleton Park	United Kingdom	The ship was severely damaged by fire at Mistley, Essex.

== 14 March ==
List of shipwrecks: 14 March 1849
Ship	State	Description
Ann	United Kingdom	The ship sprang a leak and foundered in the North Sea off Caister-on-Sea, Norfolk. Her crew were rescued by a fishing boat. She was on a voyage from Grangemouth, Stirlingshire to Middlesbrough, Yorkshire.
Iris	United Kingdom	The schooner foundered in the Mediterranean Sea off Zembra, Beylik of Tunis. All on board were rescued by the barque Sandwich (United Kingdom). Iris was on a voyage from Galaţi, Ottoman Empire to Cork or Falmouth, Cornwall.
Ranger	United Kingdom	The brig ran aground on the Blacktail Bank, off the north Kent coast.

== 15 March ==
List of shipwrecks: 15 March 1849
Ship	State	Description
Dalmatia	Austrian Empire	The steamship was wrecked on the coast of Dalmatia.
Frances	United Kingdom	The ship was wrecked on St. George's Point, 15 nautical miles (28 km) east of Gallipoli, Ottoman Empire. She was on a voyage from Constantinople, Ottoman Empire to Cork or Falmouth, Cornwall.
Ovis	Danzig	The ship was driven ashore at Danzig. She was on a voyage from Sunderland, County Durham, United Kingdom to Danzig. She was consequently condemned.
Union	United Kingdom	The Humber Keel sank in the River Derwent at Wressle, Yorkshire. Both crew survived.

== 16 March ==
List of shipwrecks: 16 March 1849
Ship	State	Description
Lydia	(United Kingdom of Great Britain and Ireland) Antigua	The droghing sloop was run in to by Jamaica and sank at Antigua. She was refloated.
Santa Maura	United Kingdom	The barque was wrecked at the entrance to the Bosphorus. She was on a voyage from Constantinople, Ottoman Empire to Odesa.

== 17 March ==
List of shipwrecks: 17 March 1849
Ship	State	Description
Adselty	United Kingdom	The brig was driven ashore near Stockton-on-Tees, County Durham. She was refloated.
Dahlia	United Kingdom	The ship was driven ashore at Ballyquinton Point, County Down. She was on a voyage from Cork to Troon, Ayrshire. She was refloated and put in to Strangford Lough.
Harriet Ann	United Kingdom	The ship was struck the Long Nose Sand, in the North Sea off the coast of Kent and sank. She was on a voyage from Portland, Dorset to London.
Hebe	United Kingdom	The ship ran aground near Formby, Lancashire. She was on a voyage from Liverpool, Lancashire to Demerara, British Guiana. She was refloated and put back to Liverpool in a leaky condition.
Vine	United Kingdom	The brig was driven ashore and damaged near Duncansby Head, Caithness. She was on a voyage from Dundee, Forfarshire to Belfast, County Antrim. She was refloated the next day.
William Nicoll	United Kingdom	The ship was driven ashore at Memel, Prussia. She was refloated the next day.

== 18 March ==
List of shipwrecks: 18 March 1849
Ship	State	Description
Belvidere	United States	The barque was driven ashore west of Folkestone, Kent, United Kingdom. She was on a voyage from Antwerp, Belgium to New York. She was refloated.
Cosmopolite	United Kingdom	The ship was driven ashore at Flamborough Head, Yorkshire. She was refloated on 20 March and taken in to Bridlington, Yorkshire for repairs.
Cygnet	United States	The brig was driven ashore at New York. She was on a voyage from New York to Halifax, Nova Scotia, British North America.
Dauntless	United Kingdom	The ship was driven ashore at the Dungeness Lighthouse, Kent. She was on a voyage from China to London. She was refloated the next day.
Golta	Austrian Empire	The ship was driven ashore at Deal, Kent. She was on a voyage from Cattaro to London She was refloated and taken in to Deal.
Maria Elizabeth	Grand Duchy of Oldenburg	The ship was abandoned in the Baltic Sea off Ventava, Courland Governorate. She was on a voyage from Venstpils to Bremen. She was taken in to Ventspils on 21 April in a waterlogged condition.
Orion	Bremen	The ship ran aground on the Goodwin Sands, Kent. She was on a voyage from Bremen to New York, United States. She was refloated the next day and taken in to The Downs.

== 19 March ==
List of shipwrecks: 19 March 1849
Ship	State	Description
Emilie	Russia	The schooner was driven ashore by ice at Ventspils.
Glory	United Kingdom	The ship was driven ashore at Corton, Suffolk. She was on a voyage from Hamburg to London. She was refloated on 20 March and taken in to Lowestoft, Suffolk in a leaky condition.
Jacaba Catherina	Spain	The ship ran aground on the Goodwin Sands. She was on a voyage from Amsterdam, North Holland, Netherlands to Bilbao. She was refloated and taken in to Ramgate, Kent.
Lydia	United Kingdom	The ship was wrecked on Barra, Outer Hebrides. She was on a voyage from Liverpool, Lancashire to Mobile, Alabama, United States.
Ocean Child	United Kingdom	The ship ran aground and sank off the Tuskar Rock.
Rover	United Kingdom	The schooner struck a sunken rock and sank in Dundrum Bay. Her crew were rescued. She was on a voyage from Liverpool to Strangford, County Antrim.
Woodman	United Kingdom	The ship ran aground off the Isle of Bute. She was on a voyage from Glasgow, Renfrewshire to Liverpool. She was refloated.

== 20 March ==
List of shipwrecks: 20 March 1849
Ship	State	Description
Alexander Robertson	United Kingdom	The barque was driven ashore at Barber's Point, in the Dardanelles. She was on a voyage from Liverpool, Lancashire to Constantinople, Ottoman Empire. She was refloated and taken in to Constantinople.
Friends	United Kingdom	The ship ran aground on the Longsand, in the North Sea off the coast of Essex. She was refloated and put in to Great Yarmouth, Norfolk in a leaky condition.
Moslem	United Kingdom	The brig was driven ashore at Barber's Point. She was on a voyage from Liverpool to Constantinople. She was refloated and taken in to Constantinople.
Samuel	United Kingdom	The schooner was driven ashore at Dungeness, Kent. She was on a voyage from Newcastle upon Tyne, Northumberland to an Irish port.
Sarah	United Kingdom	The barque sank off Fort Cumberland, Hampshire. Her crew were rescued. She was on a voyage from Chichester, Sussex to Portsmouth, Hampshire.
Sultana	United States	The schooner was discovered derelict in the Atlantic Ocean by Huron ( (United Kingdom of Great Britain and Ireland) ) British North America and was set afire.
Town of Drogheda	United Kingdom	The barque was abandoned in the Mediterranean Sea 120 nautical miles (220 km) east of Gibraltar. Her crew were rescued.

== 21 March ==
List of shipwrecks: 21 March 1849
Ship	State	Description
Anne	United Kingdom	The ship was driven ashore in Sandy Bay, Gibraltar. She was on a voyage from Almería, Spain to Cádiz, Spain.
Joseph Howe	United States	The ship was driven ashore near Boston, Massachusetts. She was on a voyage from Boston to Philadelphia, Pennsylvania. She was refloated.

== 22 March ==
List of shipwrecks: 22 March 1849
Ship	State	Description
Cavallo Mariano	Kingdom of Sardinia	The brig was in collision with a Spanish brig and sank off Cape de Gatt, Spain with the loss of a crew member. She was on a voyage from Sardinia to Malta.
Her Majesty	United Kingdom	The paddle steamer was wrecked on Rathlin Island, County Donegal. She was on a voyage from Londonderry to Fleetwood, Lancashire.

== 23 March ==
List of shipwrecks: 23 March 1849
Ship	State	Description
Abbevilloise	France	The schooner struck a sunken rock, capsized and foundered in Penzance Bay. Her crew were rescued. She was on a voyage from Saint-Valery-sur-Somme, Somme to Cardiff, Glamorgan, United Kingdom.
Ann	United Kingdom	The brigantine was driven ashore near Rota, Spain. She was on a voyage from London to Vigo and Cádiz, Spain. She was refloated on 6 April and towed in to Cádiz.
Ann	(United Kingdom of Great Britain and Ireland) Cape Colony	The ship departed from Mosel Bay for Table Bay. No further trace, presumed foundered with the loss of all hands.
Fame	United Kingdom	The brig was driven ashore on the Calf of Man, Isle of Man and was abandoned by her mate. He was rescued on 22 March. She floated off and resumed her voyage. She was on a voyage from Dublin to Maryport, Cumberland.
Gale	United Kingdom	The ship ran aground and sank at Lowestoft, Suffolk. She was refloated, beached, patched and taken in to Lowestoft.
Jeanne de Arc	United Kingdom	The schooner ran aground on the Longsand, in the North Sea off the coast of Essex, United Kingdom. She was on a voyage from Saint-Valery-sur-Somme to Blyth, Northumberland, United Kingdom. She was refloated and taken in to Wivenhoe, Essex in a leaky condition.
Laurel	United Kingdom	The ship was wrecked on the Arklow Bank, in the Irish Sea off the coast of County Wicklow.
Pactolus	United Kingdom	The ship was driven ashore and damaged at Rowe, Prussia. She was on a voyage from Newcastle upon Tyne, Northumberland to Danzig.

== 24 March ==
List of shipwrecks: 24 March 1849
Ship	State	Description
Arethusa	United Kingdom	The ship ran aground off Leander's Tower, Constantinople, Ottoman Empire with the loss of two of her crew. She was on a voyage from Constantinople to an English port. She was refloated the next day.
Bligh	United Kingdom	The ship was driven ashore and wrecked at Wick, Caithness. She was on a voyage from Sunderland, County Durham to Wick.
Lucy and Mary	United Kingdom	The ship ran aground at Lowestoft, Suffolk. She was refloated and taken in to Lowestoft.
Rose	United Kingdom	The ship was driven ashore 2 nautical miles (3.7 km) east of Calais, France. She was on a voyage from Ghent, West Flanders, Belgium to Dublin. She was refloated and taken in to Calais in a leaky condition.
Tynwald	United Kingdom	The barque was destroyed by fire in the Atlantic Ocean 103 nautical miles (191 km) off Cape Clear Island, County Cork (50°07′N 8°31′W). Her crew were rescued by O'Ferrall (Malta). Tynwald was on a voyage from Liverpool, Lancashire to the Cape of Good Hope, Cape Colony.
William Ward	United Kingdom	The whaler, a barque, was sunk by ice in the Atlantic Ocean (45°30′N 10°00′W). Her 45 crew were rescued by Fairy (United Kingdom).

== 25 March ==
List of shipwrecks: 25 March 1849
Ship	State	Description
Esther and Hannah	United Kingdom	The ship ran aground and was damaged at Lowestoft, Suffolk. She was refloated and taken in to Lowestoft in a leaky condition.
Experimentirer	Bremen	The ship ran aground and was damaged on the Voslapper Platte, off the coast of the Kingdom of Hanover. She was on a voyage from Stettin to Varel, Kingdom of Hanover.
Frances Burn	United Kingdom	The ship was driven ashore and wrecked in Algoa Bay. Her crew were rescued.
Louise Marie	(Belgium) Belgian Navy	Rio Nuñez incident: The frigate, a schooner ran aground in the Rio Nuñez. She was refloated.
Rabet	Danzig	The ship ran aground and capsized off Prerow, Grand Duchy of Mecklenburg-Schwerin with the loss of all hands. She was on a voyage from Danzig to Rostock.
Tyne	United Kingdom	The ship was wrecked on the Middle Heaps, in the North Sea off the coast of Essex. Her crew were rescued by the smack Eagle (United Kingdom). Tyne was on a voyage from Newcastle upon Tyne, Northumberland to London.

== 26 March ==
List of shipwrecks: 26 March 1849
Ship	State	Description
Barefoot	United Kingdom	The ship was wrecked on the Shipwash Sand, in the North Sea off the coast of Essex. Her crew were rescued by Union (United Kingdom). Barefoot was on a voyage from Newcastle upon Tyne, Northumberland to London.
Earl of Auckland	United Kingdom	The steamship struck a sunken rock in the Mediterranean Sea and was damaged. She was on a voyage from Constantinople, Ottoman Empire to London. She put in to Malta for repairs.
Patriot	United Kingdom	The ship departed from Newcastle upon Tyne for Swinemünde, Prussia. No further trace, presumed foundered with the loss of all hands.

== 27 March ==
List of shipwrecks: 27 March 1849
Ship	State	Description
Dean	United Kingdom	The ship was wrecked on Grand Cayman. Her crew were rescued. She was on a voyage from Liverpool, Lancashire to Veracruz, Mexico.
Minerva	(United Kingdom of Great Britain and Ireland) New South Wales	The ship caught fire, exploded and sank 60 nautical miles (110 km) off Port Fairy. All on board survived. She was on a voyage from Sydney to Portland Bay.
Ruth	United States	The ship was driven ashore on Staten Island, New York. She was on a voyage from Madeira to New York. She was refloated on 18 April.

== 28 March ==
List of shipwrecks: 28 March 1849
Ship	State	Description
Alexander Baring	United Kingdom	The ship struck the quayside at Liverpool, Lancashire and was severely damaged when her anchor was forced through her bow. She was on a voyage from London to Liverpool.
Constante	Spain	The brig was driven ashore on Fort Island Nomea. She was refloated on 30 March and taken in to Amoy, China for repairs.
George Andrew	United Kingdom	The ship was driven ashore near Knudshoved, Denmark. Her crew were rescued. She was on a voyage from Neustadt in Holstein, Duchy of Holstein to Stockton-on-Tees, County Durham. She was refloated on 7 April and taken in to Nyborg, Denmark for repairs.
Hoop	Netherlands	The ship was driven ashore and wrecked at Towyn, Denbighshire. She was on a voyage from Schiedam, South Holland to Liverpool.
Johan August	Netherlands	The schooner ran aground and sank east of Christiansand, Norway with the loss of two of her crew. She was on a voyage from Trondheim, Norway to Amsterdam, North Holland.
Morley	United Kingdom	The brig was driven ashore and severely damaged at "Aquilas", Spain. Her crew were rescued. She was refloated on 7 April.
Norge	Duchy of Holstein	The ship sank in the North Sea. Her crew were rescued. She was on a voyage from the Humber to a Norwegian port.
Ocean	(United Kingdom of Great Britain and Ireland) New Zealand	The schooner was driven onshore at Port Wakefield in the Chatham Islands during a heavy gale. All hands were saved.
Ocean	United Kingdom	The brig was driven ashore and severely damaged at "Aquilas". Her crew were rescued.

== 29 March ==
List of shipwrecks: 29 March 1849
Ship	State	Description
Helen	United Kingdom	The ship was driven ashore at Cushendall, County Antrim. Her crew were rescued. She was on a voyage from the Clyde to Glenarm, County Antrim.
Old England	United Kingdom	The ship ran aground in the Yangtze Kiang. She was on a voyage from Liverpool, Lancashire to a port in China. She had been refloated by 7 April.

== 30 March ==
List of shipwrecks: 30 March 1849
Ship	State	Description
Ebenezer	United Kingdom	The ship was driven ashore at Hemsby, Norfolk. She was refloated on 12 April and taken in to Great Yarmouth, Norfolk in a leaky condition.

== 31 March ==
List of shipwrecks: 31 March 1849
Ship	State	Description
Etna	Kingdom of the Two Sicilies	The brigantine was driven ashore and wrecked at Youghal, County Cork, United Kingdom. She was on a voyage from Liverpool, Lancashire, United Kingdom to Palermo.

== Unknown date ==
List of shipwrecks: Unknown date in March 1849
Ship	State	Description
Alcibiade	Greece	The brig collided with the brig Express (United Kingdom) and sank in the Black Sea. Her crew were rescued by Express.
Alice Ann	United Kingdom	The ship ran aground in the River Lune. She was on a voyage from Glasgow, Renfrewshire to Lancaster, Lancashire.
Amour de la Patrie	France	The ship was abandoned whilst on a voyage from Dunkirk, Nord to Bordeaux, Gironde. She was taken in to Ramsgate, Kent, United Kingdom in a derelict condition on 2 March.
Antizza	Ottoman Empire	The ship was wrecked near San Nicolo, Cerigo, Greece before 10 March.
Aristide	France	The ship was wrecked at Vauville, Manche. She was on a voyage from Bordeaux to Rouen, Seine-Inférieure.
Atkinson	United Kingdom	The ship was driven ashore at Gallipoli, Ottoman Empire. She was refloated.
Avieries	United Kingdom	The ship was driven ashore at Plymouth, Devon. She was refloated on 4 March and taken in to Frank's Quarry.
Copia	United Kingdom	The ship was lost near Sulina, Ottoman Empire before 26 March. Her crew were rescued.
Elizabeth Henry	United Kingdom	The ship was wrecked on a reef off the Loochoo Islands, Japan before 29 March.
Friendship	United Kingdom	The ship was driven ashore at Boulmer, Northumberland. She was on a voyage from Seaham, County Durham to Arbroath, Forfarshire. She was refloated on 5 March and taken in to Warkworth, Northumberland in a leaky condition.
Garnet	United Kingdom	The brig was wrecked on the Falsterbo Reef, in the Baltic Sea off the coast of Sweden. Her crew were rescued by a Royal Danish Navy frigate.
Goeli Brick	France	The ship was lost 60 leagues (180 nautical miles (330 km)) south of the mouth of the Rio Grande before 7 March.
Harriet	Sweden	The barque foundered in the Pacific Ocean in late March. There were at least five survivors. She was on a voyage from Liverpool, Lancashire to Valparaíso, Chile and Monterey, California.
Hirondelle	France	The ship was lost at the mouth of the Gironde with the loss of seven of her crew.
Inquisitive	United Kingdom	The brig was driven ashore near Halifax, Nova Scotia, British North America. She was on a voyage from Halifax to New York, United States.
Integrity	United Kingdom	The sloop was lost on or before 2 March. Her crew were rescued. She was on a voyage from Antwerp, Belgium to London.
Jane and Mary	United Kingdom	The sloop was lost on or before 2 March. Her crew were rescued.
Lamartine	United States	The brig was abandoned in the Atlantic Ocean before 30 March.
Mary	United Kingdom	The ship whaler was lost off Greenland before 31 March with the loss of all hands.
Merovee Allegre	Portugal	The steamship was in collision with another steamship and sank in the Mediterranean Sea between Sardinia and Sicily. She was on a voyage from Marseille, Bouches-du-Rhône, France to Porto.
Ordovia	United Kingdom	The schooner was wrecked west of Málaga, Spain. She was on a voyage from Málaga to an English port.
Osway	United Kingdom	The ship was driven ashore at Worthing, Sussex. She was refloated on 7 March.
Pastorelle	Belgium	The ship was wrecked near Cape Spartel, Morocco before 30 March. Her crew were rescued.
Ranger	United Kingdom	The ship was driven ashore and wrecked near Puttgarden, Prussia. Her crew were rescued. She was on a voyage from Leith, Lothian to Nakskov, Denmark.
Shakespeare	United Kingdom	The ship was lost between the mouth of the St. George and Potoza Rivers, Ottoman Empire before 26 March.
Sirius	United Kingdom	The ship struck a sunken rock and was damaged. She put in to Santa Cruz on 21 March for repairs. She was on a voyage from Falmouth, Cornwall to the Falkland Islands.
Verona	United Kingdom	The ship was abandoned in the Atlantic Ocean. Her crew were rescued by the schooner Adriano (Spain). Verona was on a voyage from Newport, Monmouthshire to New Orleans, Louisiana, United States.
Young Hebe	United Kingdom	The ship was wrecked near Cape Spencer, South Australia in late March with the loss of her crew and ten passengers.
