= List of shipwrecks in February 1852 =

The list of shipwrecks in February 1852 includes ships sunk, foundered, wrecked, grounded, or otherwise lost during February 1852.

== 1 February ==
List of shipwrecks: 1 February 1852
Ship	State	Description
Ahter	Ottoman Empire	The ship was driven ashore and wrecked at Valletta, Malta. Her crew were rescued.
Germania	Prussia	The barque was driven ashore and wrecked at Fort Ricasoli, Malta with the loss of all hands. She was on a voyage from Alexandria, Egypt to Königsberg.
Hebe	Sweden	The ship ran aground on the Varne Sandbank, in the North Sea off the coast of Kent, United Kingdom. She was on a voyage from Newcastle upon Tyne, Northumberland, United Kingdom to Malta. She was refloated and put in to Ramsgate, Kent in a leaky condition.
Hopewell	United Kingdom	The barque foundered in the Atlantic Ocean. Her crew were rescued by Jenny (United Kingdom). Hopewell was on a voyage from Montevideo, Uruguay to Liverpool, Lancashire.
Mary Ellen	United Kingdom	The ship was wrecked on the Hogsty Reef, in the Bahamas. Her crew were rescued. She was on a voyage from St. Jago de Cuba, Cuba to Bremen.
Old England	United Kingdom	The flat was severely damaged by fire at Chester, Cheshire.
Philadelphia	Bremen	The ship was wrecked at Fort Risacoli. She was on a voyage from Constantinople, Ottoman Empire to Bremen.
Saijan	Ottoman Empire	The ship was driven ashore and wrecked at Valletta. Her crew were rescued.
Twee Gebroeders	Kingdom of Hanover	The koff was wrecked on Eierland, North Holland Netherlands. She was on a voyage from Leer to London, United Kingdom.

== 2 February ==
List of shipwrecks: 2 February 1852
Ship	State	Description
Bandon	United Kingdom	The ship was in collision with Berbice (United Kingdom) in the Irish Sea. Two of the seven people on board were rescued by Berbice. Bandon was on a voyage from Kinsale, County Cork to Cardiff, Glamorgan. She was towed in to Penarth, Glamorgan in a severely damaged condition.
Emilie	Danzig	The ship was driven ashore at Salesker Strand, Prussia. She was on a voyage from Danzig to Rügenwalde, Prussia. She was refloated and taken in to Stolpemünde, Prussia for repairs.
Foreningen	Norway	The ship was driven ashore and sank near Skudesneshavn. She was on a voyage from Christiania to Stavanger and Bergen.
Gleaner	United Kingdom	The brig ran aground on Scroby Sands, Norfolk. She was refloated on 3 February and taken in to Great Yarmouth, Norfolk.
Johns	United Kingdom	The sloop departed from Kirkcaldy, Fife for Hull, Yorkshire. No further trace, presumed foundered with the loss of all hands.
Liberty	United Kingdom	The ship was driven ashore at Hartlepool, County Durham. She was on a voyage from Sunderland, County Durham to London. She was refloated and taken in to Hartlepool.
Marquis of Stafford	United Kingdom	The ship was wrecked at Salachan Point, Inverness-shire. She was on a voyage from Liverpool, Lancashire to Macduff, Aberdeenshire.
Zebedee	United Kingdom	The ship was struck the Book Rocks and was driven ashore in Thurlstone Bay. Her crew were rescued.

== 3 February ==
List of shipwrecks: 3 February 1852
Ship	State	Description
Blanche	United Kingdom	The East Indiaman was wrecked on Helen's Shoal, off Lord North's Island. Her 29 crew survived, but five of them in a boat were subsequently reported missing. Blanche was on a voyage from Singapore to Ningpo, China.
Delphin	Russia	The barque was driven ashore on Oyster Island, County Sligo, United Kingdom. She was refloated.
Gleaner	United Kingdom	The brig ran aground on Scroby Sands, Norfolk. She was refloated on 4 February and taken in to Great Yarmouth, Norfolk.
Marguerite	France	The ship departed from Saint-Malo, Ille-et-Vilaine for Plymouth, Devon, United Kingdom. No further trace, presumed foundered with the loss of all hands.
Sibsons	United Kingdom	The ship sprang a leak and was abandoned in the North Sea off Souter Point, County Durham. Her crew were rescued. She was on a voyage from South Shields, County Durham to London.

== 4 February ==
List of shipwrecks: 4 February 1852
Ship	State	Description
Coen	United Kingdom	The ship was driven ashore at Grimsby, Lincolnshire. She was on a voyage from Sunderland, County Durham to London. She was refloated.
Johann George	Bremen	The ship ran aground off Great Yarmouth, Norfolk, United Kingdom before 4 February. She was on a voyage from Bremen to Havana, Cuba. She was refloated and put back to Bremen in a leaky condition.
John Paley	United Kingdom	The schooner struck the Ore Stone, in Tor Bay and sank. Her crew were rescued. She was on a voyage from Newcastle upon Tyne, Northumberland to Nantes, Loire-Inférieure.
Mary	United Kingdom	The sloop was driven ashore at Newburgh, Fife. She was on a voyage from London to Dundee, Forfarshire. She was refloated on 6 February and taken in to Newburgh in a severely damaged condition.
Milton	United Kingdom	The brig was wrecked on the Long Key Reef, off the coast of British Honduras.
Orlando	United Kingdom	The ship was wrecked on Colonsay, Outer Hebrides. Her crew were rescued. She was on a voyage from Demerara, British Honduras to the Clyde.
Resolution	United Kingdom	The ship ran aground on the Black Rock Sand, in The Wash. She was refloated the next day.
Swift	United Kingdom	The schooner sank off the Dudgeon Sandbank, in the North Sea. Her crew were rescued by Angelina (United Kingdom). Swift was on a voyage from Hartlepool, County Durham to Jersey, Channel Islands.

== 5 February ==
List of shipwrecks: 5 February 1852
Ship	State	Description
Content	United Kingdom	The brig ran aground on the Gunfleet Sand, in the North Sea off the coast of Essex. She was on a voyage from Newcastle upon Tyne, Northumberland to London. She was refloated with assistance from the smacks Providence and Tryal (both United Kingdom) and assisted in to Harwich, Essex in a leaky condition.
Lady Anne	United Kingdom	The schooner collided with the brig Curlew (United Kingdom) and sank in the North Sea north of Flamborough Head, Yorkshire. Her crew were rescued. She was on a voyage from Goole, Yorkshire to London. Lady Anne was refloated on 25 June.
Maria	Denmark	The sloop was wrecked on Nidingen, in the Baltic Sea. She was on a voyage from Copenhagen to Grimsby, Lincolnshire, United Kingdom.
Sampson	United Kingdom	The ship was driven ashore on Rathlin Island, County Donegal.
Spey	United Kingdom	The brig was driven ashore at Carstown Point, County Louth. She was on a voyage from Whitehaven, Cumberland to Dublin. She was refloated and taken in to the Strangford Lough.

== 6 February ==
List of shipwrecks: 6 February 1852
Ship	State	Description
Catherine	United Kingdom	The sloop was driven ashore at Fishguard, Pembrokeshire. She was on a voyage from Cardigan to Milford Haven, Pembrokeshire. She was refloated on 8 March.
Elizabeth and Ann	United Kingdom	The ship was driven ashore and severely damaged at Fishguard. She was on a voyage from Aberystwyth, Cardiganshire to Limerick.
Emperreza	Brazil	The brig was severely damaged in a gale at Lisbon, Portugal.
Henrietta	United Kingdom	The ship was driven ashore at Fishguard. She was on a voyage from Barrow in Furness, Lancashire to Newport, Monmouthshire.
Larch	United Kingdom	The ship was driven ashore on the Stony Breakers, on the east coast of the United States and was abandoned by all but her captain. She was on a voyage from Liverpool, Lancashire to New York United States. Her captain abandoned ship the next day. She had become a wreck by 12 February.
Lovely Lass	United Kingdom	The ship was driven ashore at Fishguard. She was on a voyage from Whitehaven, Cumberland to Cardiff, Glamorgan. She was refloated on 19 February.
Olympus	United Kingdom	The ship was driven ashore and damaged at Penzance, Cornwall. She was refloated the next day and taken in to Penzance for repairs.
Sarah	United Kingdom	The smack was driven ashore at Fishguard. She was on a voyage from Cardigan to Bristol, Gloucestershire.
Thyatira	United Kingdom	The ship was driven ashore at Coatham, Yorkshire. She was on a voyage from Stockton on Tees, County Durham to Hartlepool, County Durham. She was refloated the next day and put in to Middlesbrough, Yorkshire.

== 7 February ==
List of shipwrecks: 7 February 1852
Ship	State	Description
Ferdinand	Prussia	The brig departed from Charleston, South Carolina, United States for Stettin. No further trace, presumed foundered with the loss of all hands.
Lorn	United Kingdom	The sloop was driven ashore in the River Tay She was on a voyage from Liverpool, Lancashire to Perth. She was refloated and taken in to Dundee, Forfarshire in a severely leaky condition.
Palmyra	United Kingdom	The ship ran aground on the Roar Sand, in the English Channel off Dungeness, Kent. She was refloated.
Petrel	United Kingdom	The ship ran aground on the Sizewell Bank, in the North Sea off the coast of Suffolk. She was refloated and resumed her voyage.

== 8 February ==
List of shipwrecks: 8 February 1852
Ship	State	Description
Ant	United Kingdom	The steamboat ran aground in the River Thames under Blackfriars Bridge, London and was damaged. She consequently sank at the London Bridge Pier, all on board having safely landed.
Endeavour	United Kingdom	The ship ran aground off Morro Castle, Havana, Cuba. She was on a voyage from Newcastle upon Tyne, Northumberland to Havana. She was refloated the next day.
Jersey Tar	(United Kingdom of Great Britain and Ireland) Jersey	The schooner ran aground on the Whitehouse Bank, in the Irish Sea off the coast of County Antrim.
Kœnig Elizabeth Louise	Danzig	The ship struck a sunken rock off Arnish Point, Isle of Lewis, Outer Hebrides, United Kingdom. She was on a voyage from Danzig to Liverpool, Lancashire, United Kingdom. She put in to Stornoway, Isle of Lewis in a leaky condition.
Louisa	United Kingdom	The ship ran aground at Littlehampton, Sussex. She was on a voyage from Hartlepool, County Durham to Weymouth, Dorset.
Nordstern	Norway	The ship was driven ashore on Eierland, North Holland, Netherlands. Her crew were rescued. She was on a voyage from Christiansand to Bordeaux, Gironde, France.
Sarah	United Kingdom	The barque was driven ashore on Edisto Island, South Carolina, United States and was abandoned by her crew. She was on a voyage from Liverpool to Charleston, South Carolina.

== 9 February ==
List of shipwrecks: 9 February 1852
Ship	State	Description
Daring	United Kingdom	The ship was driven ashore in Downing's Bay, County Donegal. She was on a voyage from Glasgow, Renfrewshire to Saint Croix, Virgin Islands.
Fife Packet	United Kingdom	The ship was driven ashore at Lindisfarne, Northumberland. She was on a voyage from St. Andrews, Fife to Newcastle upon Tyne, Northumberland. She was refloated and taken in to Leith, Lothian.
Halifax Packet	United Kingdom	The ship was driven ashore at Penarth, Glamorgan. She was refloated and taken in to Bristol, Gloucestershire.
Hercules	United Kingdom	The ship was abandoned. Her crew were rescued. She was on a voyage from Penang, Malaya to London.
Hope	United Kingdom	The ship was wrecked on the Herd Sand, in the North Sea off the coast of County Durham. Her crew survived. She was on a voyage from Arbroath, Forfarshire to Newcastle upon Tyne. She was refloated on 5 March.
Lord Gough	United Kingdom	The ship was driven onto the Carr Rock on the coast of Lothian. She was on a voyage from Callao, Peru to Leith. She was refloated and taken in to Leith.
Sarah Johannes	Denmark	The brig was driven ashore and wrecked at Lima, Peru.
West Lothian	United Kingdom	The schooner was driven ashore and sank at the entrance to the Belfast Lough. She was on a voyage from Glasgow to Rio de Janeiro, Brazil. She was refloated on 23 February and towed in to Belfast, County Antrim by Belfast (United Kingdom).
William Hogarth	United Kingdom	The ship foundered with the loss of all hands. She was on a voyage from Aberdeen to Lerwick, Shetland Islands.

== 10 February ==
List of shipwrecks: 10 February 1852
Ship	State	Description
Addington	United Kingdom	The ship ran aground in the Strangford Lough. She was on a voyage from Strangford, County Antrim to Dublin. She was refloated and resumed her voyage.
Agnes	United Kingdom	The barque ran aground off Cowes, Isle of Wight. She was on a voyage from London to Trinidad. She was refloated the next day with assistance from HMS Sprightly (Royal Navy).
Astrea	United Kingdom	The ship collided with the quayside at Dublin and was severely damaged. She was on a voyage from Whitehaven, Cumberland to Dublin.
Harbinger, and Resolution	United Kingdom	The steamship Harbinger was in collision with the brig Resolution in the River Thames at Northfleet, Kent. Resolution sank; her crew were rescued by Harbinger, which was driven ashore. Harbinger was on a voyage from London to the Cape Colony. She was refloated the next day and taken in to Gravesend, Kent. The wreck of Resolution was dispersed by explosives on 26 March.
Hope	United Kingdom	The ship ran aground on the Herd Sand, in the North Sea off the coast of County Durham. Her crew were rescued. She was refloated on 3 March.
Lucy	United Kingdom	The ship ran aground in the Swash. She was on a voyage from Bristol, Gloucestershire to Barbados.
William and Mary	United Kingdom	The sloop was driven ashore at Blyth, Northumberland. Her crew were rescued by the Coastguard and a fishing boat. She was on a voyage from Port Dundas, Renfrewshire to Sunderland, County Durham.
Zetus	United Kingdom	The ship put in to Point de Galle, Ceylon with her cargo of coal on fire and was scuttled. She was on a voyage from London to Bombay, India.

== 11 February ==
List of shipwrecks: 11 February 1852
Ship	State	Description
Caroline Louise	Prussia	The schooner was driven ashore at Windau. Her crew were rescued.
Celerity	United Kingdom	The ship sprang a leak and was beached at St. Ives, Cornwall. She was on a voyage from Newport, Monmouthshire to London.
Constantine	France	The ship was driven ashore on Hog Island, New York City, United States. She was on a voyage from Havre de Grâce, Seine-Inférieure to New York City. She broke up on 28 February.
Cornwall	United Kingdom	The barque was abandoned in the Atlantic Ocean. Her crew were rescued by Pleiades (United Kingdom). Cornwall was subsequently boarded by the crew of a French brig. It was reported that they intended to take her in to A Coruña, Spain.
Eliza	United Kingdom	The ship was wrecked on the Currigavaddra Rock, off the coast of County Cork. Her crew were rescued. She was on a voyage from Liverpool, Lancashire to Limerick.
Porto	Netherlands	The ship was driven ashore on the Dutch coast. She was on a voyage from Rotterdam, South Holland to Athens, Greece. She was refloated the next day and put back to Rotterdam.
Providence	United Kingdom	The brig was wrecked on the South Gar Sand, at the mouth of the River Tees with the loss of all but one of her crew. The survivor was rescued by Royal Victoria (United Kingdom). Providence was on a voyage from Liverpool to Newcastle upon Tyne, Northumberland.

== 12 February ==
List of shipwrecks: 12 February 1852
Ship	State	Description
Emma	United Kingdom	The ship was driven ashore at Portland Bill, Dorset. She was on a voyage from Hartlepool, County Durham to Exeter, Devon. She was refloated and taken in to Weymouth, Dorset in a leaky condition.
Jeune Christine	France	The ship ran aground at Salé, Morocco. She was on a voyage from Rabat, Morocco to Marseille, Bouches-du-Rhône. She was consequently condemned.
Uzella	United Kingdom	The ship ran aground on the Platters, in the Irish Sea. She was on a voyage from Liverpool, Lancashire to Naples, Kingdom of the Two Sicilies. She was refloated and put in to Holyhead, Anglesey in a leaky condition.
Zealous	United Kingdom	The schooner ran aground off Tarifa, Spain. She was refloated and taken in to Gibraltar.

== 13 February ==
List of shipwrecks: 13 February 1852
Ship	State	Description
Concordia	(United Kingdom of Great Britain and Ireland) Jamaica	The brigantine ran aground on a reef off Falmouth, Jamaica. She was refloated and resumed her voyage.
Pickwick	United Kingdom	The ship was in collision with Chimæra (United States) and was abandoned in the Irish Sea 30 nautical miles (56 km) north west of Holyhead, Anglesey. Three people were taken off by Phœnix (United Kingdom), the rest of her crew by Chimæra. Pickwick was on a voyage from Valparaíso, Chile to Liverpool, Lancashire. She was subsequently taken in tow by the schooner Agnes, which handed over to the tug President (both United Kingdom). She arrived at Liverpool on 16 February.
Sisters	United Kingdom	The sloop was abandoned in the Irish Sea off Great Orme Head, Caernarfonshire. She was on a voyage from Liverpool to Dublin. She was towed in to Liverpool on 14 February by the tug Albert (United Kingdom).
Waterloo	United Kingdom	The full-rigged ship was in collision with a barque and sank in the English Channel off Start Point, Devon. Her crew were rescued by Eleanor (United Kingdom). Waterloo was on a voyage from South Shields, County Durham to New York, United States.

== 14 February ==
List of shipwrecks: 14 February 1852
Ship	State	Description
Antarctic	United Kingdom	The ship ran aground on the Blackwater Bank, in the Irish Sea off the coast of County Wexford. She was on a voyage from Liverpool, Lancashire to New York. She was refloated the next day and put back to Liverpool.
Ashburton	United Kingdom	The ship was driven ashore Rockaway, New Jersey, United States. she was on a voyage from New York to Liverpool. She was refloated and resumed her voyage.
Caddow	United States	The steamboat sank in the Mississippi River near New Orleans, Louisiana with the loss of five lives.
J. W. Anderson	United States	The schooner capsized in a squall off the east coast of the United States.
Mary Ann	United Kingdom	The ship ran aground on the Pentland Skerries and was damaged. She was refloated on 20 February.

== 15 February ==
List of shipwrecks: 15 February 1852
Ship	State	Description
Eliza	United Kingdom	The barque collided with the full-rigged ship Glenorchy (United Kingdom) and foundered off Pladda. Her crew were rescued by Mulatto (United Kingdom).
Eliza	United Kingdom	The ship was wrecked on the Dog Rocks, off Bearhaven, County Cork. Her crew were rescued. She was on a voyage from Liverpool, Lancashire to Dublin.
Harriet Nash	United Kingdom	The ship ran aground at Figueira da Foz, Portugal. She was on a voyage from Galaţi, Ottoman Empire to Falmouth, Cornwall. She broke up on 24 February.
Juliana	United Kingdom	The sloop was driven ashore and wrecked in Dundrum Bay. Her crew survived. She was on a voyage from Caernarfon to Ayr.
Majestic	United Kingdom	The ship sank off Cape St. Vincent, Portugal. Her crew were rescued. She was on a voyage from Licata, Sicily to Liverpool.
Maria Emilia	Kingdom of the Two Sicilies	The ship was wrecked on the Dulas Rocks, on the coast of Anglesey, United Kingdom of Great Britain and Ireland. Her crew were rescued. She was on a voyage from Liverpool to Naples.
Mary Ann	United Kingdom	The ship was driven ashore and wrecked 3 nautical miles (5.6 km) east of Dunbar, Lothian. Her crew were rescued. She was on a voyage from Newcastle upon Tyne, Northumberland to Culross, Fife.
Mary Jane	United Kingdom	The brigantine was in collision with another vessel and sank off the Bishop Rock Lighthouse. Her crew were rescued by John Bunyan (United Kingdom). Mary Jane was on a voyage from Chester, Cheshire to New Ross, County Wexford.
Sarah Jane	United Kingdom	The ship ran aground on the Corig Rock, off the coast of County Dublin and was abandoned. She was on a voyage from Dublin to Wexford.
Warrior	United Kingdom	The ship struck a sunken rock off Derbyhaven, Isle of Man and was damaged. She was on a voyage from Liverpool to London. She put in to Douglas, Isle of Man in a leaky condition.

== 16 February ==
List of shipwrecks: 16 February 1852
Ship	State	Description
Daring	United Kingdom	The ship was driven ashore in Downing's Bay, County Donegal. She was on a voyage from the Clyde to Saint Croix, Virgin Islands.
Harmony	United Kingdom	The ship was run into by the paddle steamer Thistle (United Kingdom) and was driven ashore at Portrush, County Antrim, Ireland. She was a total loss.
Hope	United Kingdom	The ship was driven ashore in Moville Bay, in Lough Foyle. She was refloated on 20 February.
Hope	United Kingdom	The schooner was in collision with Jacobus (Netherlands) and sank in the English Channel off the coast of Dorset. She was on a voyage from Antwerp, Belgium to Belfast, County Antrim.
Shamrock	United Kingdom	The ship was run into by the paddle steamer Thistle (United Kingdom) and was driven ashore at Portrush, County Antrim Ireland. She was refloated and found to be leaky.
Vainilla	(United Kingdom of Great Britain and Ireland) British North America	The ship was abandoned in the Atlantic Ocean. All on board were rescued by Riero (Belgium). She was on a voyage from Saint John, New Brunswick to a port in California, United States.

== 17 February ==
List of shipwrecks: 17 February 1852
Ship	State	Description
Agilis	United Kingdom	The ship was in collision with Andre et Celeste (France) and foundered in the Atlantic Ocean 100 nautical miles (190 km) north west of Ouessant, Finistère, France with the loss of a crew member. Survivors were rescued by Andre et Celeste. Agilis was on a voyage from Malta to Dartmouth, Devon.
Ann Falcon	United Kingdom	The brigantine was driven ashore and wrecked on Daagh Island, County Donegal with the loss of a crew member. She was on a voyage from Limerick to Glasgow, Renfrewshire.
Jane	United Kingdom	The ship departed from Marseille, Bouches-du-Rhône, France for Falmouth, Cornwall. No further trace, presumed foundered with the loss of all hands.
Jane Francis	United Kingdom	The ship was driven ashore at Arthurstown, County Wexford.
Jean	United Kingdom	The ship was abandoned in the Atlantic Ocean. Her crew were rescued. She was on a voyage from Odesa to Antwerp, Belgium.
Merlin	United Kingdom	The steamship ran aground on Little Saba, in the Virgin Islands and was disabled. She was refloated and towed in to Saint Thomas by Crocodile (French Navy).
Miriam	United Kingdom	The ship was driven ashore at Scarborough, Yorkshire. She was on a voyage from London to South Shields, County Durham. She was refloated and taken in to Scarborough in a severely leaky condition.
Royal William	United Kingdom	The paddle steamer ran aground on the North Bank, in the Irish Sea off the coast of County Dublin. She was refloated the next day and resumed her voyage.
Venelia	(United Kingdom of Great Britain and Ireland) British North America	The ship was abandoned in the Atlantic Ocean. Her crew were rescued by Hiero (United Kingdom). Venelia was on a voyage from St. Stephen, New Brunswick to California, United States.
William	United Kingdom	The sloop was driven ashore and sank north of Happisburgh, Norfolk. She was on a voyage from Glasgow, Renfrewshire to Lowestoft, Suffolk.

== 18 February ==
List of shipwrecks: 18 February 1852
Ship	State	Description
Active	(United Kingdom of Great Britain and Ireland) New South Wales	The ketch was wrecked at the mouth of the Hunter River.
Eendraght Macht Magt	Netherlands	The ship was wrecked on the Mynderts Droogte Reef, off "Wanjoewangie", Netherlands East Indies. Her crew were rescued.
Eiche	Prussia	The ship capsized in the English Channel between Beachy Head, Sussex and the Isle of Wight, United Kingdom with the loss of two of her crew. Survivors were rescued by Royal Thistle (United Kingdom). Eiche was on a voyage from Stettin to Cette, Hérault, France. She was discovered derelict on 22 February and taken in to Shoreham-by-Sea, Sussex.
Geerdina	Danzig	The ship was driven ashore on Goree, Zeeland, Netherlands. Her crew were rescued. She was on a voyage from Danzig to London, United Kingdom. She was declared a total loss.
Glenroy	United Kingdom	The ship was run into by the brig Medora (United Kingdom) and was consequently beached at Penarth, Glamorgan, where she sank. She was refloated the next day and taken in to Cardiff, Glamorgan for repairs.
Hope	United Kingdom	The schooner capsized and sank in the English Channel 5 nautical miles (9.3 km) south west of St. Catherine's Point, Isle of Wight.
Janneke	Netherlands	The ship ran aground in the Vlie. Her crew survived. She was on a voyage from London to Amsterdam, North Holland.
Mary Ellen	United Kingdom	The ship sprang a leak and was beached at Runcorn, Cheshire. She was on a voyage from Limerick to Runcorn.
Pizarro	Denmark	The brig was reported to have foundered off Texel, North Holland, Netherlands with the loss of a crew member. Survivors were rescued by Diana (United Kingdom). Pizarro was on a voyage from Copenhagen to Hull, Yorkshire, United Kingdom. She was subsequently towed in the Harwich, Essex, United Kingdom in a derelict condition.
Prince Albert	Malta	The ship sank off "Iviera", County Donegal, United Kingdom. She was on a voyage from Glasgow, Renfrewshire, United Kingdom to Trieste.
Williams	United Kingdom	The sloop ran aground on the Haisborough Sands, in the North Sea off the coast of Norfolk and sank. She was on a voyage from Glasgow to Lowestoft, Suffolk.

== 19 February ==
List of shipwrecks: 19 February 1852
Ship	State	Description
Allen	United Kingdom	The ship was driven ashore at Newburgh, Fife. She was refloated on 23 February.
Eagle	United Kingdom	The flat sprang a leak and was abandoned in the Irish Sea off the coast of Lancashire. She was on a voyage from Ravenglass, Cumberland to Woodend, Cheshire.
Equateur	France	The ship was wrecked west of Fécamp, Seine-Inférieure. Her crew were rescued. She was on a voyage from Sunderland, County Durham, United Kingdom to Bordeaux, Gironde.
George	United Kingdom	The ship struck a rock in the Loire and was damaged. She was on a voyage from Newcastle upon Tyne, Northumberland to Paimbœuf, Loire-Inférieure.
Geraldina	Danzig	The ship was driven ashore on Goeree, Zeeland, Netherlands. She was on a voyage from Danzig to London, United Kingdom.
Mary Ann	United Kingdom	The ship caught fire in the Wallet Channel, off the coast of Essex and was scuttled. She was on a voyage from Goole, Yorkshire to London. Mary Ann was refloated the next day and assisted into Colchester, Essex by the smack Dart (United Kingdom).
Polly	United Kingdom	The collier, a brig, ran aground on the Mouse Sand, off the Kent coast. Her crew were rescued by the smack Susannah (United Kingdom). Polly was on a voyage from south Shields, County Durham to London.
Providence	United Kingdom	The ship was wrecked on the South Gar, off the coast of County Durham with the loss of all but one of her crew. She was on a voyage from Liverpool, Lancashire to Newcastle upon Tyne, Northumberland.
Rival	United Kingdom	The collier, a brig, ran aground on the Gunfleet Sand, in the North Sea off the coast of Essex. She was on a voyage from Sunderland, County Durham to London. She was refloated the next day and taken in to Sheerness, Kent in a leaky condition.
St. Pierre	France	The ship was wrecked on "Pionbino Island", Grand Duchy of Tuscany.

== 20 February ==
List of shipwrecks: 20 February 1852
Ship	State	Description
Adèle	France	The ship collided with Eclipse (United Kingdom), capsized and sank in the English Channel 13 nautical miles (24 km) off Beachy Head, Sussex, United Kingdom. Her crew were rescued by Eclipse. Adèle was on a voyage from Cette, Hèrault to Saint-Valery-sur-Somme, Somme. She was towed in to Newhaven, Sussex the next day by HMRC Cameleon ( Board of Customs) and Martha (United Kingdom).
Duke of Wellington	United Kingdom	The ship was in collision with the sloop Maria (United Kingdom) and was beached in the Humber. She was refloated.
Manningtree Packet	United Kingdom	The ship was in collision with Ellen (United Kingdom) and was beached in the River Gipping.
Mary Ann	United Kingdom	The ship caught fire and was scuttled at Harwich, Essex. She was on a voyage from Goole, Yorkshire to London.
Meridian	United Kingdom	The ship ran aground at the mouth of the Mississippi River. She was on a voyage from New Orleans, Louisiana, United States to Liverpool, Lancashire.
Polly	United Kingdom	The ship was driven ashore and wrecked at Maldon, Essex. Her crew were rescued.

== 21 February ==
List of shipwrecks: 21 February 1852
Ship	State	Description
Active	(United Kingdom of Great Britain and Ireland) New South Wales	The cutter was wrecked at Newcastle.
Coke	United Kingdom	The sloop was driven ashore at Wells-next-the-Sea, Norfolk. She was refloated and taken in to Wells-next-the-Sea in a leaky condition.
Colbert	France	The ship was driven ashore in the Loire near Nantes, Loire-Inférieure. She was on a voyage from Nantes to Réunion.
Française Adele	France	The ship was in collision with Eclipse (United Kingdom) and capsized and sank in the English Channel 13 nautical miles (24 km) west half south of Beachy Head, Sussex, United Kingdom. Her crew were rescued by Eclipse. Françarie Adele was on a voyage from Cette, Hérault to Saint-Valery-sur-Somme, Somme.
Mary	United Kingdom	The ship was wrecked on the Whitby Rock. Her crew were rescued. She was on a voyage from South Shields, County Durham to London.
Wave	United Kingdom	The ship ran aground in the River Tay. She was on a voyage from "South Ferry" to Copenhagen, Denmark. She was refloated and taken in to Dundee, Forfarshire in a leaky condition.

== 22 February ==
List of shipwrecks: 22 February 1852
Ship	State	Description
Mary Allan	United Kingdom	The ship was wrecked on the Whitby Rock. Her crew took to a boat and were rescued by Glance (United Kingdom). Mary Allan was on a voyage from South Shields, County Durham to London.
Speed	Prussia	The ship was driven ashore east of Wells-next-the-Sea, Norfolk, United Kingdom. She was on a voyage from Memel to Brancaster, Norfolk.

== 23 February ==
List of shipwrecks: 27 February 1852
Ship	State	Description
Comete	France	The ship was wrecked on Île d'Yeu, Vendée.
Deborah	(United Kingdom of Great Britain and Ireland) New South Wales	The ship was wrecked at "Anatam". Her crew were rescued.
Eagle	United Kingdom	The smack was in collision with the smack Friend's Goodwill (United Kingdom) and sank in the North Sea off the coast of Essex. Her crew were rescued by the smack New Gipsy (United Kingdom). She was refloated on 6 March and taken in to Wivenhoe, Essex in a leaky condition.
Larne	United Kingdom	The full-rigged ship struck the pier at Ramsgate, Kent and was damaged. She was on a voyage from Valparaíso, Chile to Leith, Lothian.
New Leeds	United Kingdom	The ship was destroyed by fire 5 nautical miles (9.3 km) off Cley-next-the-Sea, Norfolk. Her three crew were rescued by the galiot Lydia ( Duchy of Holstein). New Leeds was reported to be on a voyage from Colchester, Essex to London.
Pizarro	Norway	The brig was discovered derelict in the North Sea off Lowestoft, Suffolk, United Kingdom. She was towed in to Harwich, Essex.

== 24 February ==
List of shipwrecks: 24 February 1852
Ship	State	Description
France	France	The ship was lost off Bougie, Algeria. Her crew were rescued.
Inez	Spain	The ship was driven ashore near Algeciras. She was on a voyage from Barcelona to New Orleans, Louisiana, United States. She subsequently broke up.
Julia Eliza	(United Kingdom of Great Britain and Ireland) British North America	The ship was driven ashore at Placentia, Newfoundland. Her crew were rescued. She was on a voyage from Halifax, Nova Scotia to Fortune Bay, Newfoundland.
Margaret	United Kingdom	The ship ran aground at Wicklow. She was on a voyage from Liverpool, Lancashire to Wicklow. Several vessels collided with her before she was refloated on 4 March.
Sofia	Russia	The brig was lost at the entrance to the Bosphorus with the loss of all but three of her crew.
Vier Gebroeders	Netherlands	The galiot ran aground at Punta Mala, Spain. She was on a voyage from Cardiff, Glamorgan, United Kingdom to Galaţi, Ottoman Empire.

== 25 February ==
List of shipwrecks: 25 February 1852
Ship	State	Description
Egidius	France	The ship struck a sunken rock and was damaged. She was on a voyage from Marseille, Bouches-du-Rhône to Liverpool, Lancashire, United Kingdom. She put in to Gibraltar in a sinking condition.
Elizabeth	United Kingdom	The schooner was holed by ice at New York, United States.
Hendrina	Netherlands	The galiot ran aground and sank between the Runnel Stone and the coast of Cornwall, United Kingdom. Her crew were rescued by the smack Farmer's Delight (United Kingdom). Hendrina was on a voyage from Rotterdam, South Holland to Belfast, County Antrim, United Kingdom. She was towed in to the Isles of Scilly, United Kingdom by Allegro (Netherlands) on 28 February and righted.
Thetis	United Kingdom	The schooner ran aground on the South Shoals, in the Irish Sea off the coast of County Wexford.
Thorwaldsen	Denmark	The brig was wrecked in the "Bompjes Islands", Netherlands East Indies. Her crew were rescued by the full-rigged ship Joan (Netherlands). Thorwaldsen was on a voyage from Batavia to Surabaya.

== 26 February ==
List of shipwrecks: 26 February 1852
Ship	State	Description
Carnation	United Kingdom	The ship was lost on the Grand Banks of Newfoundland. Her crew were rescued. She was on a voyage from South Shields, County Durham to Quebec City, Province of Canada, British North America.
HMS Birkenhead	Royal Navy	The Wreck of the Birkenhead (1901) by Charles Dixon. The troopship, a steam frigate, was wrecked on a reef off Danger Point near Gansbaai, Africa with the loss of 450 of the 693 people on board. She was on a voyage from Cape Town, Cape Colony to Algoa Bay. most survivors rescued by Schooner "Lioness".
Friend's Goodwill	United Kingdom	The smack was run into by another smack and sank in the Wallet Channel, off the coast of Essex. Her crew survived.
Hermann	Bremen	The ship ran aground at New York, United States. She was on a voyage from New York to Bremen. She was refloated and put back to New York.
Printemps	France	The ship was wrecked in the "Bay of Trespasses". Her crew were rescued. She was on a voyage from Nantes, Loire-Inférieure to Dieppe, Seine-Inférieure
Vier Geschwester	Kingdom of Hanover	The galiot was wrecked on the Mouse Sand, in the North Sea off the coast of Kent, United Kingdom with the loss of three of her four crew. She was on a voyage from Hanover to London, United Kingdom.

== 27 February ==
List of shipwrecks: 27 February 1852
Ship	State	Description
Firefly	United Kingdom	The ship was driven ashore and severely damaged west of Findhorn, Moray. She was on a voyage from Easdale, Argyllshire to Dundee, Forfarshire.
Providence	United Kingdom	The ship was wrecked at the mouth of the River Tees with the loss of nine crew.

== 28 February ==
List of shipwrecks: 28 February 1852
Ship	State	Description
Ami du Commerce	France	The ship was discovered abandoned Cape San Sebastian, Spain. She was towed in to Málaga.
HMS Contest, and HMS Sphinx	Royal Navy	HMS Sphinx ran aground on a rock in the Yangtze near Ningpo, China and was run into by HMS Contest, which she was towing. Both vessels were damaged.
Eleanor	United Kingdom	The schooner was driven ashore and wrecked south of Fraserburgh, Aberdeenshire. She was on a voyage from Sunderland, County Durham to Lossiemouth, Inverness-shire.
Hermann	Bremen	The steamship ran aground at New York, United States and was damaged. She was on a voyage from New York to Bremen. She was refloated and put back to New York.
Maitland	(United Kingdom of Great Britain and Ireland) New South Wales	The steamship sank at Sydney.
Pandora	United Kingdom	The ship ran aground at Port St. Mary, Isle of Man and was severely damaged. She was on a voyage from Dublin to Whitehaven, Cumberland.
Thames	(United Kingdom of Great Britain and Ireland) Victoria	The steamship struck a sunken rock off Point Cook and was consequently beached. All on board were rescued. She was on a voyage from Melbourne to Geelong.
Themis	France	The ship was driven ashore near Boulogne, Pas-de-Calais. Her crew were rescued. She was on a voyage from Adra, Spain to Dunkirk, Nord.
Waterwitch	United Kingdom	The ship ran aground and was severely damaged at Bridlington, East Riding of Yorkshire. She was on a voyage from Middlesbrough, Yorkshire to London. She was refloated and put back to Bridlington in a leaky condition.

== 29 February ==
List of shipwrecks: 29 February 1852
Ship	State	Description
David Luckie	United Kingdom	The ship caught fire, exploded and sank in the Atlantic Ocean 90 nautical miles (170 km) off the mouth of the Orinoco River. Her crew survived. She was on a voyage from Demerara, British Guiana to London.
Mary Kingdoan	United States	The steamboat suffered a boiler explosion in the Mississippi River downstream of New Orleans, Louisiana with the loss of five lives.
North America	United States	The steamship was wrecked near Acapulco, Mexico. All on board, more than 750 people, were rescued.
Philena	United States	The ship was wrecked near Cape Henry, Virginia. She was on a voyage from Liverpool, Lancashire, United Kingdom to Baltimore, Maryland.

== Unknown date ==
List of shipwrecks: Unknown date in February 1852
Ship	State	Description
Aladdin	United Kingdom	The full-rigged ship was abandoned in the Atlantic Ocean off the Isles of Scilly before 4 February.
Angeline	Netherlands	The ship was driven ashore at Hellevoetsluis, Zeeland. She was on a voyage from Hellevoetsluis to New York. She was refloated on 14 February and resumed her voyage.
Ann and Jane	United Kingdom	The ship was lost in the Kangean Islands, Netherlands East Indies before 5 February. She was on a voyage from Shanghai, China to Sydney, New South Wales.
Argyle	United Kingdom	The barque foundered in the Irish Sea before 7 February. She was on a voyage from Callao, Peru to an English port.
Bounty	United Kingdom	The sloop foundered off the coast of Norway before 20 February. Her crew were rescued. She was on a voyage from East Wemyss, Fife to Stettin.
Ceres	France	The ship ran aground near Dinan, Côtes du Nord. She was on a voyage from Dinan to Dunkirk, Nord. She was refloated on 15 February and taken in to Saint-Malo, Ille-et-Vilaine.
Charles Kerr	United Kingdom	The ship was driven ashore on Scharhörn. She was on a voyage from South Shields, County Durham to the East Indies. She was refloated on 8 February and assisted in to Cuxhaven in a sinking condition.
HMS Cyclops	Royal Navy	The Cyclops-class frigate ran aground off the Isle of Wight. She was on a voyage from the Cape of Good Hope, Cape Colony to Sheerness, Kent. She was refloated and completed her voyage.
Due Fratelli	Grand Duchy of Tuscany	The brig was wrecked. All on board were rescued. She was on a voyage from Livorno to Málaga, Spain.
Echo	United Kingdom	The ship ran aground near St. Agnes, Isles of Scilly. She was on a voyage from St Agnes to São Miguel Island, Azores. She was refloated on 26 February and resumed her voyage.
Ely	United Kingdom	The ship was driven ashore at St. Ives, Cornwall. She was on a voyage from Newport, Monmouthshire to Hayle, Cornwall. She was refloated on 21 February and found to be severely leaky.
Emperor of China	United Kingdom	The ship was wrecked on the Loco Reef, in the Banda Sea before 15 February. All on board were rescued by Far West (United Kingdom). Emperor of China was on a voyage from London to Shanghai, China.
Familiens Haab	Norway	The ship was wrecked on Langholmene before 9 February. Her crew were rescued.
General Murray	United Kingdom	The ship ran aground on the Corton Sand, in the North Sea off the coast of Suffolk. She was on a voyage from Hartlepool, County Durham to Fécamp, Seine-Inférieure, France.
Heiress	United Kingdom	The ship was driven ashore. She was on a voyage from Newcastle upon Tyne, Northumberland to Teignmouth, Devon. She was refloated and completed her voyage, arriving at Teignmouth on 11 February.
Isabella	United Kingdom	The schooner was in collision with another vessel and was abandoned in the Irish Sea. She was subsequently towed in to Beaumaris, Anglesey.
John Toole	United Kingdom	The ship was wrecked in the Aran Islands, County Galway before 3 February with loss of life. She was on a voyage from New Orleans, Louisiana, United States to Liverpool, Lancashire.
Kincardine	United Kingdom	The ship was driven ashore near Allonby, Cumberland. She was on a voyage from Belfast, County Antrim to Maryport, Cumberland. She was refloated on 7 February and taken in to Maryport.
Mary	United Kingdom	The schooner foundered off the north coast of Cornwall between 14 and 18 February. She was on a voyage from Cardiff, Glamorgan to Penzance, Cornwall.
Mary Ann	United States	The brig was destroyed by fire in the Atlantic Ocean. Her crew were rescued by the barque Brothers (United States).
Responsible	(United Kingdom of Great Britain and Ireland) British North America	The schooner was driven ashore by ice in Plaister Cove before 2 February. She was on a voyage from Boston, Massachusetts, United States to Prince Edward Island.
Rose	United Kingdom	The felucca was wrecked on the Barbary Coast. She was on a voyage from Gibraltar to Ceuta, Spain.
Uno	Hudson's Bay Company	The brig was driven ashore near Cape Flattery, Oregon Territory before 17 February. She was plundered and burnt by the local inhabitants.
