= Dominek railway station =

Railway station in Poland

Dominek

General information
- Location: Dominek; Poland
- Coordinates: 54.585679°N 17.107916°E
- Owner: Polskie Koleje Państwowe S.A.
- Platforms: None

Construction
- Structure type: Building: No; Depot: No; Water tower: No

History
- Former names: Dominke
Location

Dominek is a non-operational PKP railway station in Dominek (Pomeranian Voivodeship), Poland.

== Lines crossing the station ==
Start station	End station	Line type
Kępno	Komnino	Dismantled
