= Vainilla =

Vainilla(s) may refer to:

== Prominent uses ==
- Vainilla, the Spanish word from which the English word "vanilla" is derived
- Vanilla (2025 Mexican film), a 2025 Mexican film directed by Mayra Hermosillo
- Vania Vainilla, stage name of Diego Millán Tarrason, a Spanish drag performer

== Other uses ==
- Vainilla, a Spanish programming language
- Vainilla, a British North American ship wrecked on 16 February 1852
- Vainillas, a village and canton in El Carrizal, El Salvador
- Vainillas, an Argentine biscuit
