= Golęcino =

Golęcino may refer to the following places in Poland:

- Golęcino, Szczecin
- Golęcino, Pomeranian Voivodeship
