= Machowino =

- Village
- Location within Poland
- Coordinates: 54°33′9″N 17°0′13″E
- Country: Poland
- Voivodeship: Pomeranian
- County: Słupsk
- Gmina: Ustka
- Population: 500

Machowino [maxɔˈvinɔ] (German: Groß Machmin) is a village in the administrative district of Gmina Ustka, within Słupsk County, Pomeranian Voivodeship, in northern Poland. The western part of the village is also known as Machowino-Kolonia.

For the history of the region, see History of Pomerania.
