= Pęplinko =

- Settlement
- Location within Poland
- Coordinates: 54°32′7″N 16°54′8″E
- Country: Poland
- Voivodeship: Pomeranian
- County: Słupsk
- Gmina: Ustka

Pęplinko [pɛmˈplinkɔ] is a settlement in the administrative district of Gmina Ustka, within Słupsk County, Pomeranian Voivodeship, in northern Poland.

For the history of the region, see History of Pomerania.
