= Zapadłe, Słupsk County =

Zapadłe
- Village
- Location within Poland
- Coordinates: 54°35′20″N 16°55′4″E
- Country: Poland
- Voivodeship: Pomeranian
- County: Słupsk
- Gmina: Ustka
- Population: 98

Zapadłe [zaˈpadwɛ] is a village in the administrative district of Gmina Ustka, within Słupsk County, Pomeranian Voivodeship, in northern Poland.

For the history of the region, see History of Pomerania.
