= Machowino-Kolonia =

- Settlement
- Location within Poland
- Coordinates: 54°33′5″N 16°58′38″E
- Country: Poland
- Voivodeship: Pomeranian
- County: Słupsk County
- Gmina: Gmina Ustka

Machowino-Kolonia [maxɔˈvinɔ kɔˈlɔɲa zaˈxɔdɲa] is a settlement in the administrative district of Gmina Ustka, within Słupsk County, Pomeranian Voivodeship, in northern Poland. It lies approximately 9 kilometres (6 mi) south-east of Ustka, 11 km (7 mi) north of Słupsk, and 110 km (68 mi) west of the regional capital Gdańsk.

For the history of the region, see History of Pomerania.
