= Osieki Słupskie =

- Village
- Location within Poland
- Coordinates: 54°36′18″N 17°5′22″E
- Country: Poland
- Voivodeship: Pomeranian
- County: Słupsk
- Gmina: Ustka

Population
  - Total: 127
- Time zone: UTC+1 (CET)
  - Summer (DST): UTC+2 (CEST)
- Postal code: 76-211

Osieki Słupskie [ɔˈɕɛki ˈswupskʲɛ] is a village in the administrative district of Gmina Ustka, within Słupsk County, Pomeranian Voivodeship, in northern Poland.
