= Zaleskie, Pomeranian Voivodeship =

Zaleskie
- Village
- Location within Poland
- Coordinates: 54°31′16″N 16°45′51″E
- Country: Poland
- Voivodeship: Pomeranian
- County: Słupsk
- Gmina: Ustka
- Population: 400

Zaleskie [zaˈlɛskʲɛ] (German: Saleske) is a village in the administrative district of Gmina Ustka, within Słupsk County, Pomeranian Voivodeship, in northern Poland.

For the history of the region, see History of Pomerania.
