= Dalimierz Przewłocki =

- Settlement
- Location within Poland
- Coordinates: 54°34′44″N 16°56′31″E
- Country: Poland
- Voivodeship: Pomeranian
- County: Słupsk
- Gmina: Ustka
- Population: 20

Dalimierz Przewłocki [daˈlimjɛʂ pʂɛˈvwɔt͡ski] is a settlement in the administrative district of Gmina Ustka, within Słupsk County, Pomeranian Voivodeship, in northern Poland.

For the history of the region, see History of Pomerania.
