= Starkowo, Słupsk County =

Starkowo
- Village
- Location within Poland
- Coordinates: 54°30′37″N 16°48′19″E
- Country: Poland
- Voivodeship: Pomeranian
- County: Słupsk
- Gmina: Ustka
- Population: 203

Starkowo [starˈkɔvɔ] (German: Starkow) is a village in the administrative district of Gmina Ustka, within Słupsk County, Pomeranian Voivodeship, in northern Poland.

For the history of the region, see History of Pomerania.
