= Objazda, Pomeranian Voivodeship =

Objazda
- Village
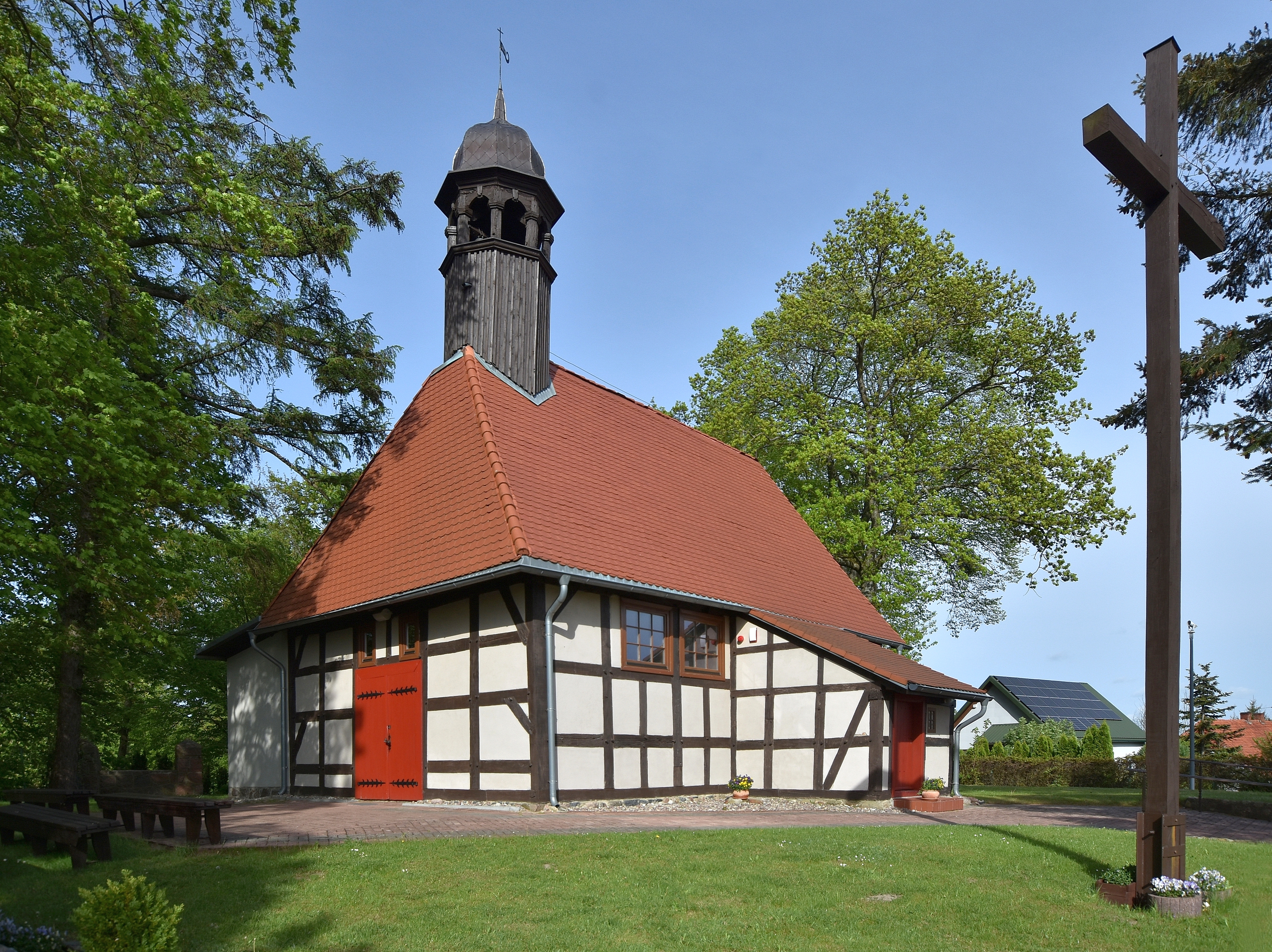
- Our Lady of Częstochowa church Objazda

- Location within Poland
- Coordinates: 54°36′29″N 17°2′32″E
- Country: Poland
- Voivodeship: Pomeranian
- County: Słupsk
- Gmina: Ustka

Population
  - Total: 905
- Time zone: UTC+1 (CET)
  - Summer (DST): UTC+2 (CEST)
- Vehicle registration: GSL

Objazda [ɔbˈjazda] (German: Wobesde) is a village in the administrative district of Gmina Ustka, within Słupsk County, Pomeranian Voivodeship, in northern Poland. It is located in the historic region of Pomerania.

== History ==
The village was founded by Kashubians. In 1281, Mestwin II, Duke of Pomerania granted the tithe from Objazda to the Cistercian monastery in Białoboki near Trzebiatów. At the time, it formed part of Gdańsk Pomerania. Later on, it formed part of the duchies of Słupsk and Pomerania until 1648. Afterwards it formed part of the Margraviate of Brandenburg, Kingdom of Prussia and Germany. Following Germany's defeat in World War II in 1945, the village became again part of Poland.
