= Pęplin =

- Settlement
- Location within Poland
- Coordinates: 54°31′37″N 16°48′57″E
- Country: Poland
- Voivodeship: Pomeranian
- County: Słupsk
- Gmina: Ustka

Pęplin [ˈpɛmplin] is a settlement in the administrative district of Gmina Ustka, within Słupsk County, Pomeranian Voivodeship, in northern Poland.

For the history of the region, see History of Pomerania.
