= Objazda-Kolonia =

- Village
- Location within Poland
- Coordinates: 54°35′42″N 17°3′57″E
- Country: Poland
- Voivodeship: Pomeranian
- County: Słupsk
- Gmina: Ustka

Objazda-Kolonia [ɔbˈjazda kɔˈlɔɲa] is a village in the administrative district of Gmina Ustka, within Słupsk County, Pomeranian Voivodeship, in northern Poland.

For the history of the region, see History of Pomerania.
