= Gąbino-Kolonia =

- Settlement
- Location within Poland
- Coordinates: 54°34′58″N 17°5′9″E
- Country: Poland
- Voivodeship: Pomeranian
- County: Słupsk
- Gmina: Ustka

Gąbino-Kolonia [ɡɔmˈbinɔ kɔˈlɔɲa] is a settlement in the administrative district of Gmina Ustka, within Słupsk County, Pomeranian Voivodeship, in northern Poland.

For the history of the region, see History of Pomerania.
