= Modlinek, Pomeranian Voivodeship =

Modlinek
- Village
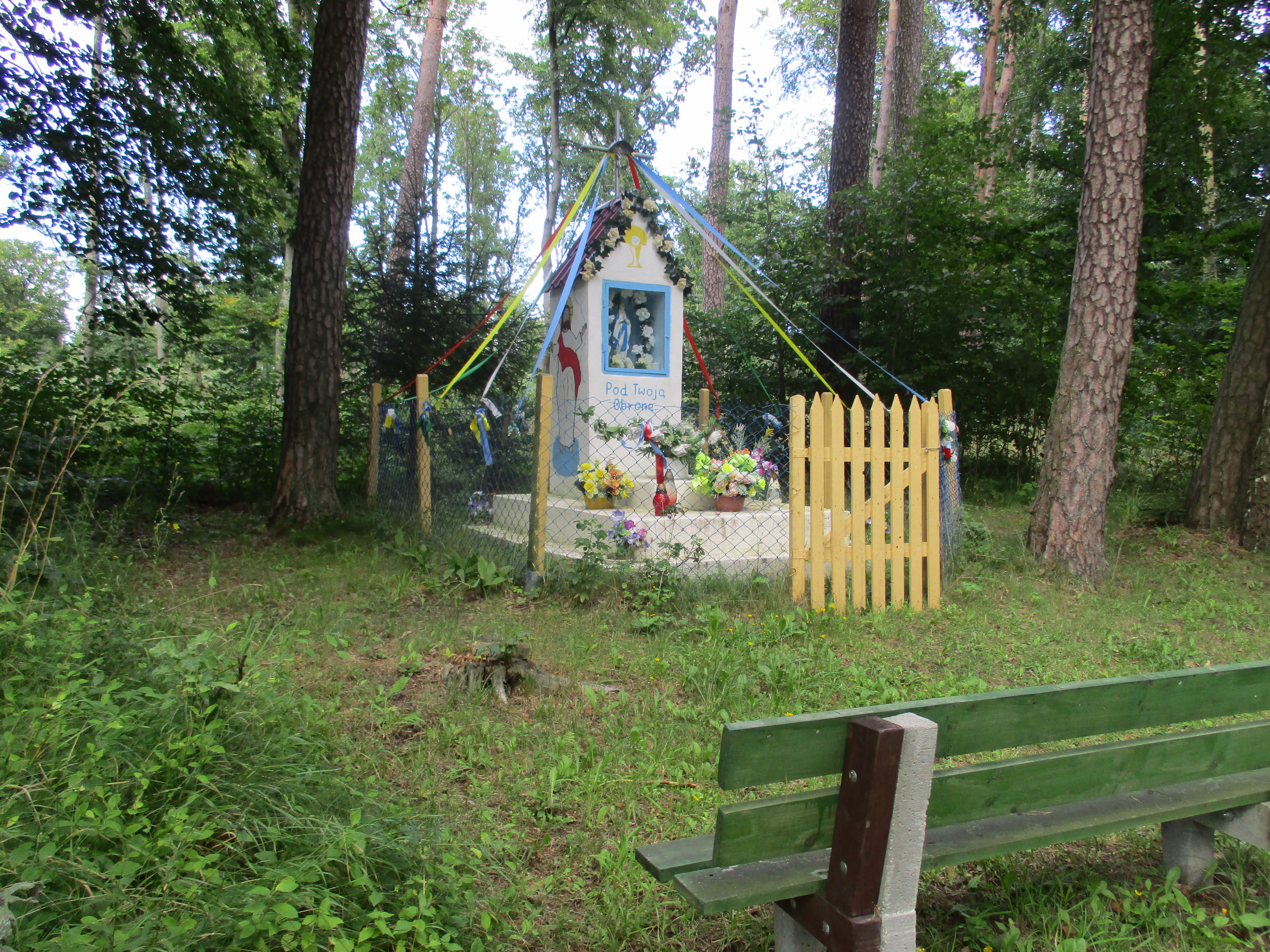
- Wayside shrine in Modlinek

- Location within Poland
- Coordinates: 54°33′49″N 16°47′32″E
- Country: Poland
- Voivodeship: Pomeranian
- County: Słupsk
- Gmina: Ustka
- Population: 45
- Time zone: UTC+1 (CET)
  - Summer (DST): UTC+2 (CEST)
- Vehicle registration: GSL

Modlinek [mɔdˈlinɛk] is a village in the administrative district of Gmina Ustka, within Słupsk County, Pomeranian Voivodeship, in northern Poland. It is located on the Slovincian Coast.
