= Gąbino =

- Village
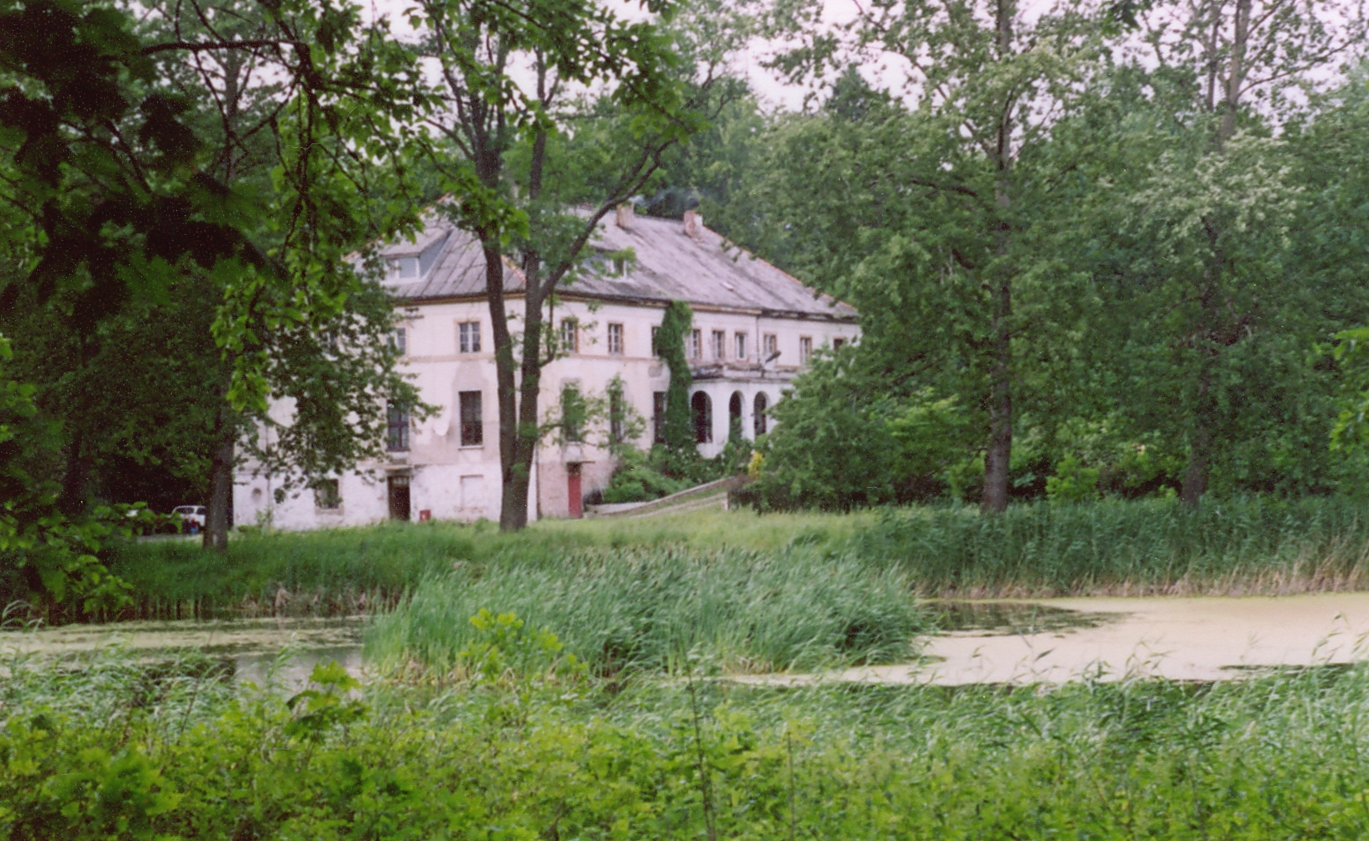
- Gąbino Palace

- Location within Poland
- Coordinates: 54°35′48″N 17°5′45″E
- Country: Poland
- Voivodeship: Pomeranian
- County: Słupsk
- Gmina: Ustka
- Population: 380

Gąbino [ɡɔmˈbinɔ] (German: Gambin) is a village in the administrative district of Gmina Ustka, within Słupsk County, Pomeranian Voivodeship, in northern Poland.

For the history of the region, see History of Pomerania.
