= Orzechowo, Pomeranian Voivodeship =

Orzechowo
- Settlement
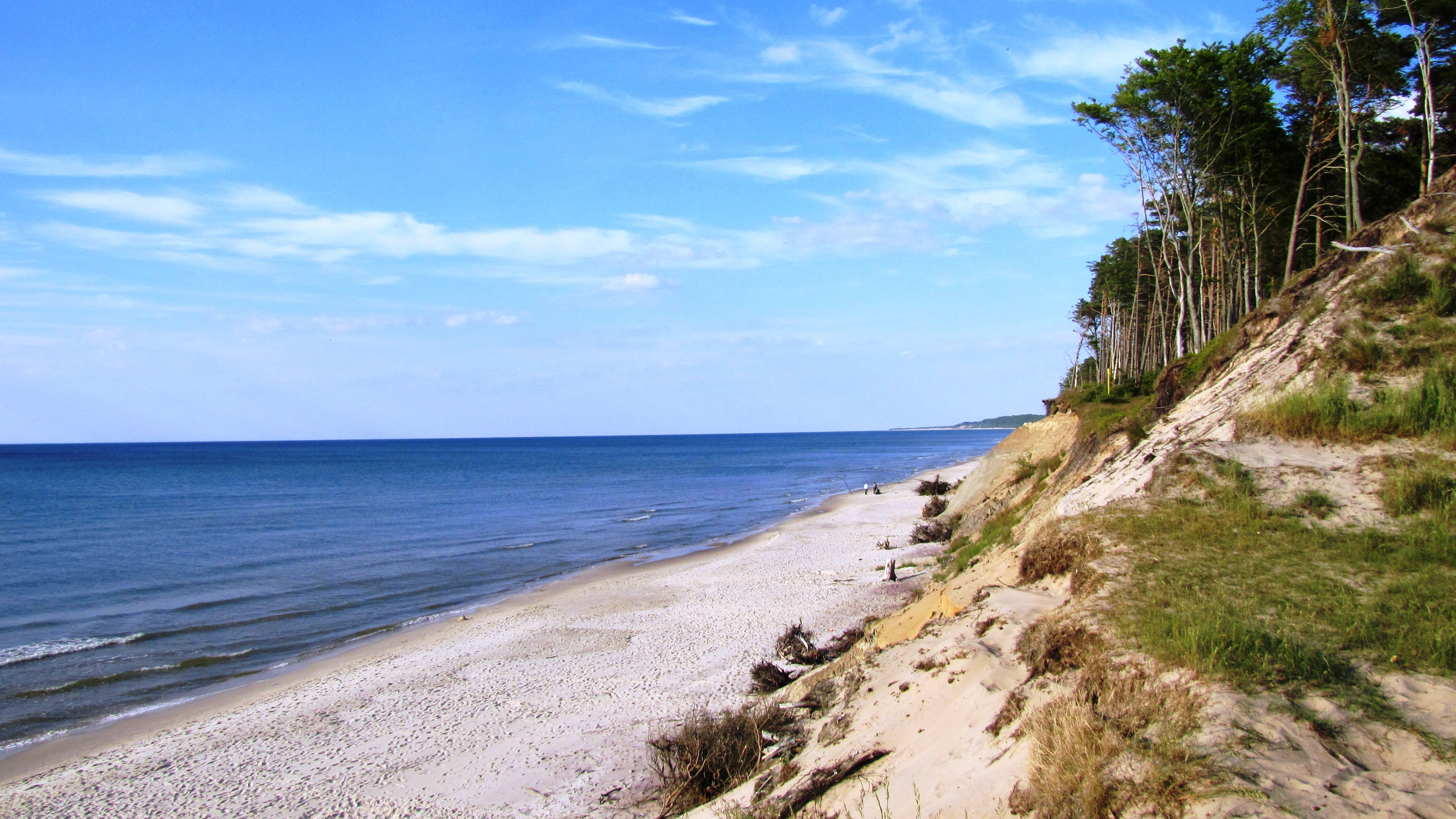
- Beach in Orzechowo

- Location within Poland
- Coordinates: 54°35′54″N 16°55′20″E
- Country: Poland
- Voivodeship: Pomeranian
- County: Słupsk
- Gmina: Ustka
- Time zone: UTC+1 (CET)
  - Summer (DST): UTC+2 (CEST)
- Vehicle registration: GSL

Orzechowo [ɔʐɛˈxɔvɔ] is a settlement in the administrative district of Gmina Ustka, within Słupsk County, Pomeranian Voivodeship, in northern Poland. It is located at the mouth of the Orzechowa River on the Slovincian Coast.
