= Owczary, Słupsk County =

Owczary
- Settlement
- Location within Poland
- Coordinates: 54°35′18″N 17°0′38″E
- Country: Poland
- Voivodeship: Pomeranian
- County: Słupsk
- Gmina: Ustka

Owczary [ɔfˈt͡ʂarɨ] is a settlement in the administrative district of Gmina Ustka, within Słupsk County, Pomeranian Voivodeship, in northern Poland.

For the history of the region, see History of Pomerania.
