= Wodnica, Pomeranian Voivodeship =

Wodnica
- Village
- Location within Poland
- Coordinates: 54°31′37″N 16°52′8″E
- Country: Poland
- Voivodeship: Pomeranian
- County: Słupsk
- Gmina: Ustka
- Population: 346

Wodnica [vɔdˈnit͡sa] (German: Hohenstein) is a village in the administrative district of Gmina Ustka, within Słupsk County, Pomeranian Voivodeship, in northern Poland.

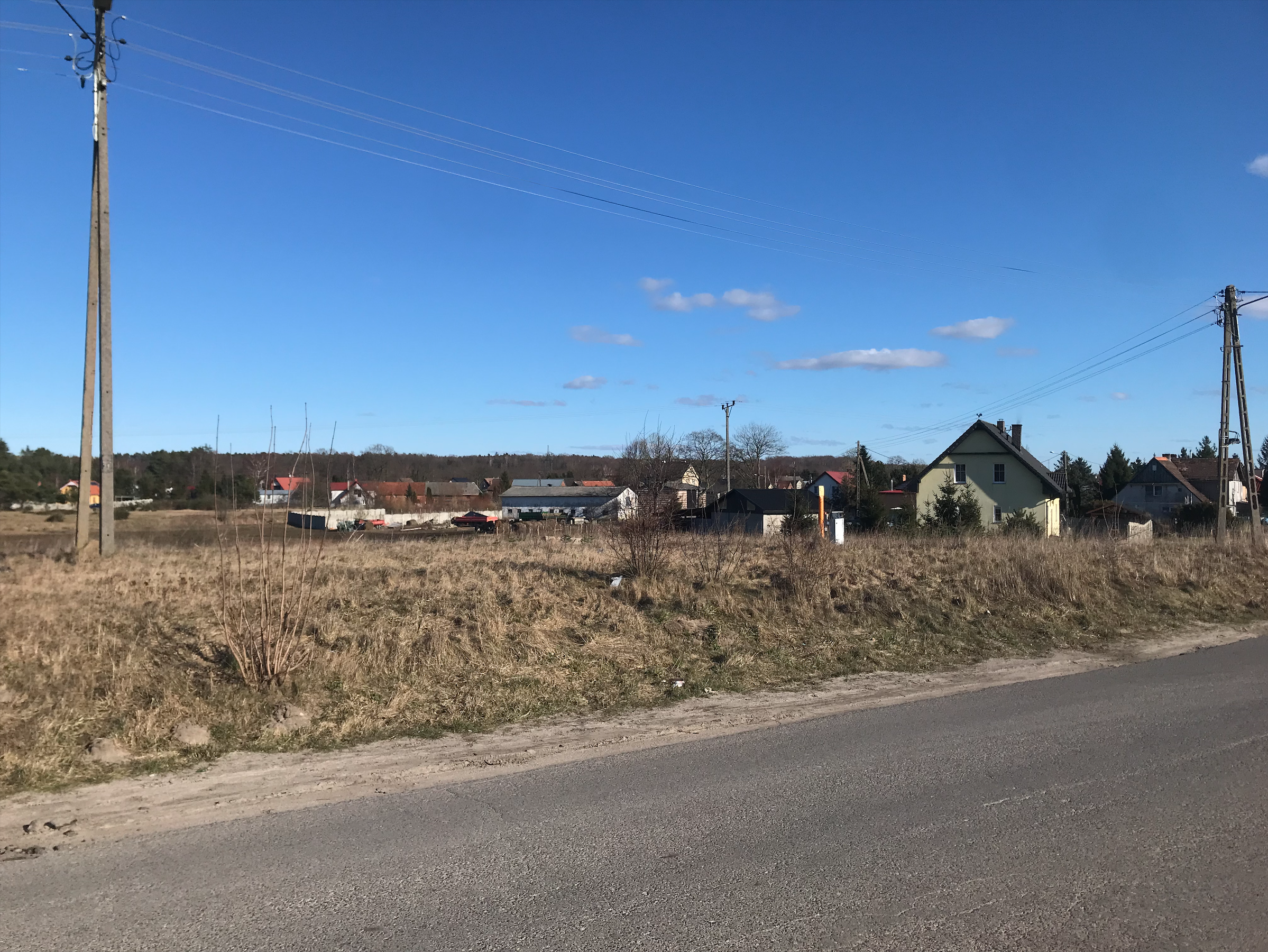
Wodnica

For the history of the region, see History of Pomerania.
