= Krężołki =

- Settlement
- Location within Poland
- Coordinates: 54°29′59″N 16°49′49″E
- Country: Poland
- Voivodeship: Pomeranian
- County: Słupsk
- Gmina: Ustka
- Population: 15

Krężołki [krɛ̃ˈʐɔu̯ki] is a settlement in the administrative district of Gmina Ustka, within Słupsk County, Pomeranian Voivodeship, in northern Poland.

For the history of the region, see History of Pomerania.
