= Machowinko =

Village in Poland

- Village
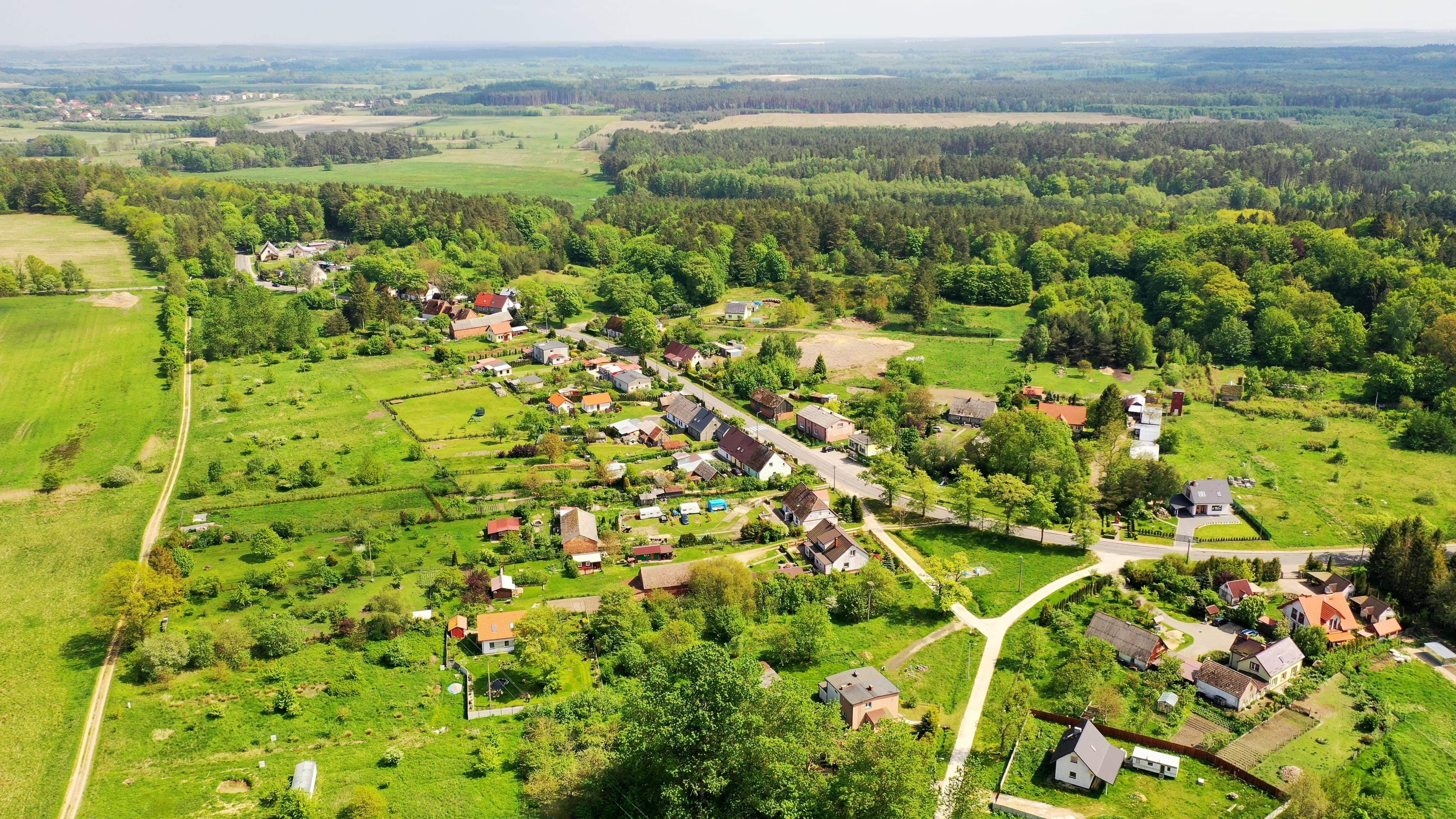

- Location within Poland
- Coordinates: 54°35′54″N 17°0′27″E
- Country: Poland
- Voivodeship: Pomeranian
- County: Słupsk
- Gmina: Ustka
- Population: 280

Machowinko [maxɔˈvinkɔ] (German: Klein Machmin, Kashubian: Môłé Machòwino) is a village in the administrative district of Gmina Ustka, within Słupsk County, Pomeranian Voivodeship, in northern Poland.

For the history of the region, see History of Pomerania.
