= Lędowo-Osiedle =

- Village
- Location within Poland
- Coordinates: 54°34′17″N 16°49′10″E
- Country: Poland
- Voivodeship: Pomeranian
- County: Słupsk
- Gmina: Ustka
- Population: 280

Lędowo-Osiedle [lɛnˈdɔvɔ ɔˈɕɛdlɛ] is a village in the administrative district of Gmina Ustka, within Słupsk County, Pomeranian Voivodeship, in northern Poland.

For the history of the region, see History of Pomerania.
