= Dębina, Słupsk County =

Dębina
- Village
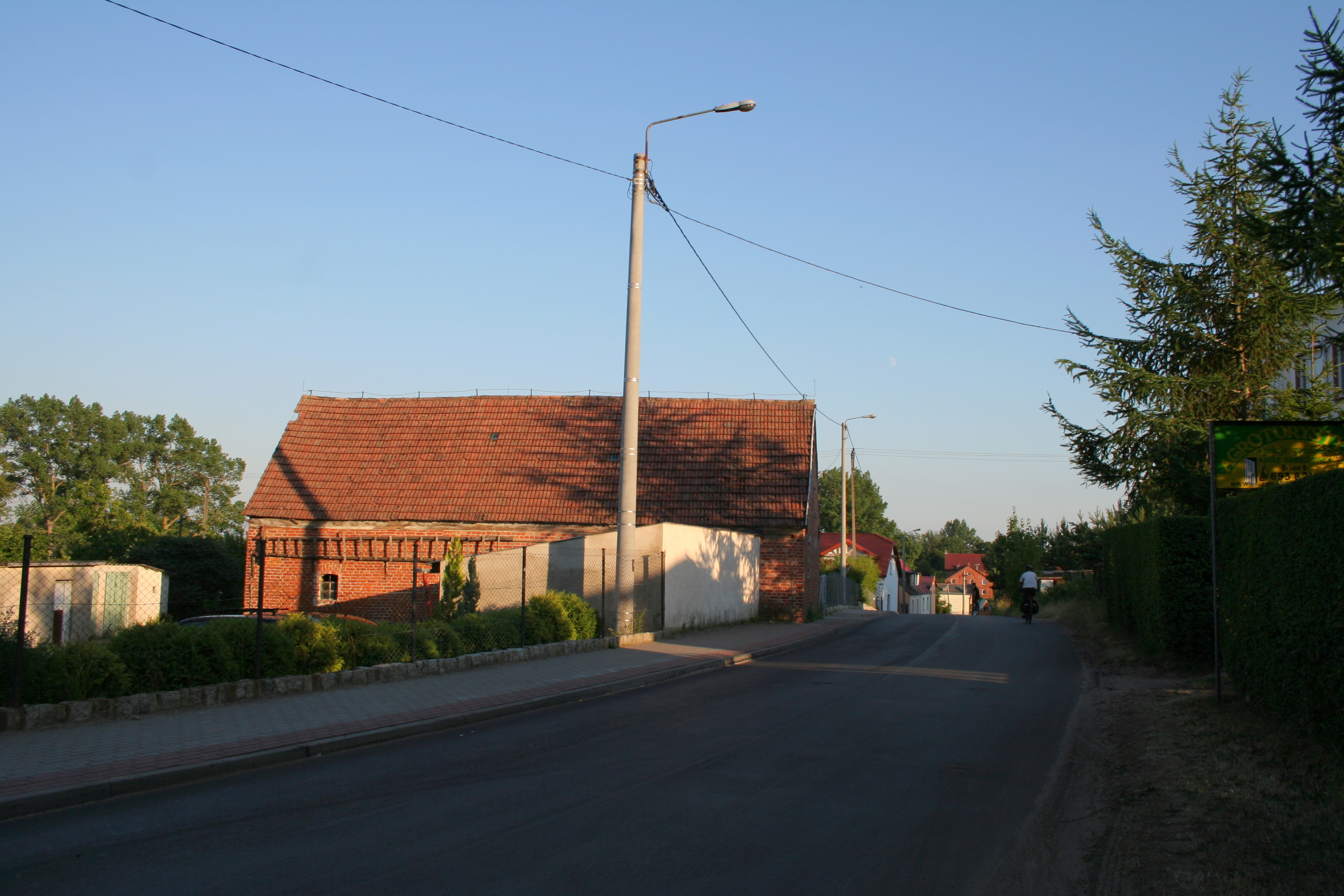

- Location within Poland
- Coordinates: 54°38′9″N 17°1′5″E
- Country: Poland
- Voivodeship: Pomeranian
- County: Słupsk
- Gmina: Ustka
- Population: 112
- Time zone: UTC+1 (CET)
  - Summer (DST): UTC+2 (CEST)
- Vehicle registration: GSL

Dębina [dɛmˈbina] (German: Schönwalde) is a village in the administrative district of Gmina Ustka, within Słupsk County, Pomeranian Voivodeship, in northern Poland. It is located on the Slovincian Coast.
