= Żabiniec, Pomeranian Voivodeship =

Żabiniec
- Settlement
- Location within Poland
- Coordinates: 54°36′13″N 17°6′36″E
- Country: Poland
- Voivodeship: Pomeranian
- County: Słupsk
- Gmina: Ustka

Żabiniec [ʐaˈbiɲɛt͡s] is a settlement in the administrative district of Gmina Ustka, within Słupsk County, Pomeranian Voivodeship, in northern Poland.

For the history of the region, see History of Pomerania.
