= Przewłoka, Pomeranian Voivodeship =

Przewłoka
- Village
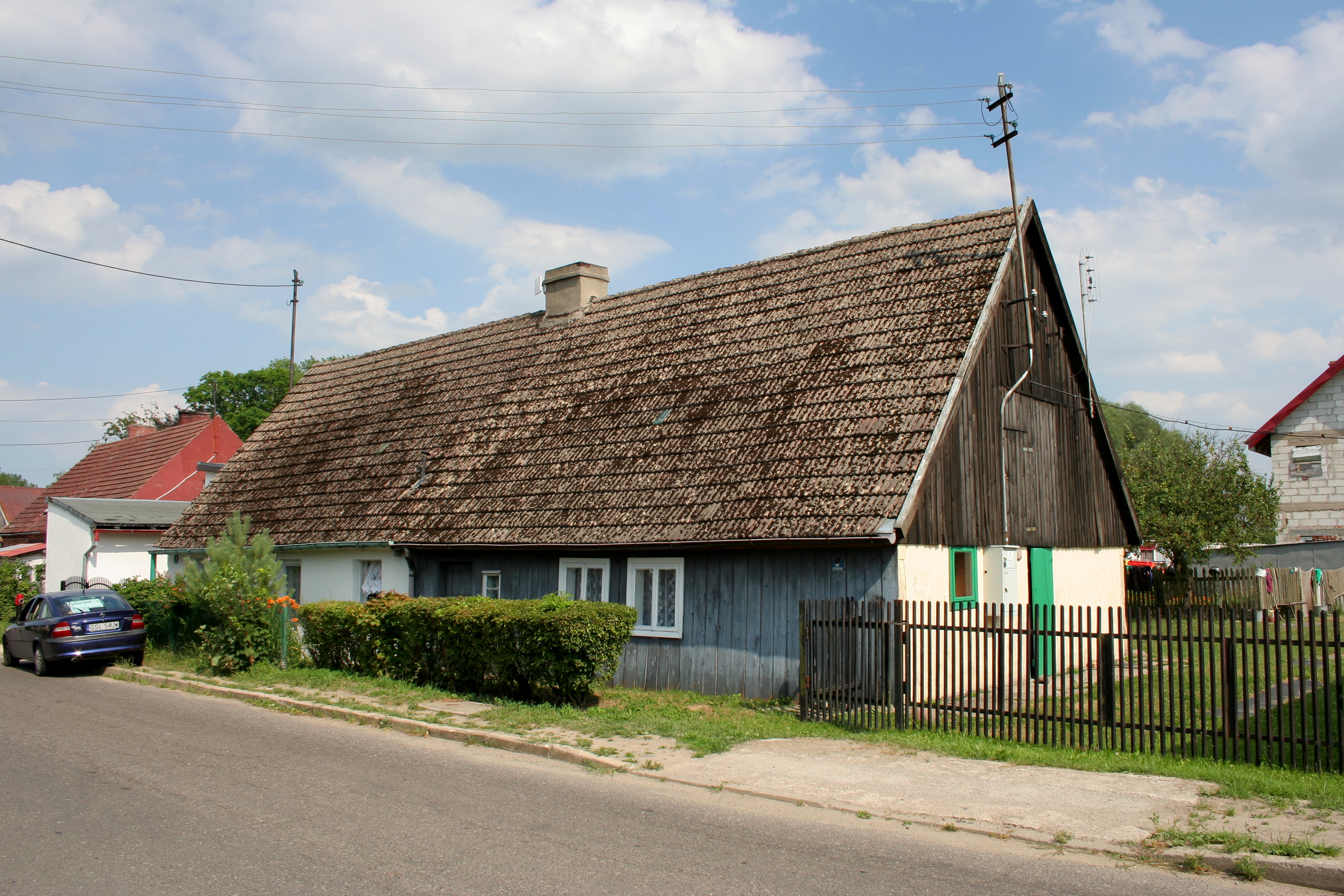

- Location within Poland
- Coordinates: 54°34′46″N 16°54′11″E
- Country: Poland
- Voivodeship: Pomeranian
- County: Słupsk
- Gmina: Ustka
- Population: 180

Przewłoka [pʂɛˈvwɔka] (German: Strickershagen) is a village in the administrative district of Gmina Ustka, within Słupsk County, Pomeranian Voivodeship, in northern Poland.

For the history of the region, see History of Pomerania.
