= Zabłocie, Słupsk County =

Settlement in Poland

Zabłocie
- Colony
- Location within Poland
- Coordinates: 54°31′37″N 16°45′18″E
- Country: Poland
- Voivodeship: Pomeranian
- County: Słupsk
- Gmina: Ustka

Population
  - Total: 12
- Time zone: UTC+1 (CET)
  - Summer (DST): UTC+2 (CEST)

Zabłocie [zaˈbwɔt͡ɕɛ] is a colony in the administrative district of Gmina Ustka, within Słupsk County, Pomeranian Voivodeship, in northern Poland.
