= Możdżanowo =

- Village
- Location within Poland
- Coordinates: 54°30′02″N 16°46′37″E
- Country: Poland
- Voivodeship: Pomeranian
- County: Słupsk
- Gmina: Ustka
- Population: 220

Możdżanowo [mɔʐd͡ʐaˈnɔvɔ] (German: Mützenow) is a village in the administrative district of Gmina Ustka, within Słupsk County, Pomeranian Voivodeship, in northern Poland.
