= Nieuwerkerk (volcano) =

Submarine volcano in the Banda Sea, Indonesia

- Summit depth: 2,285 metres (7,497 feet)

Location
- Location: Banda Sea
- Coordinates: 6°36′S 124°40.5′E
- Country: Indonesia

Geology
- Type: submarine volcano
- Last eruption: 1927?

Nieuwerkerk is a submarine volcano in the Banda Sea, Indonesia. Together with the Emperor of China submarine volcano, it forms a ridge (NEC ridge) on the seabed. The NEC ridge has been dredged at depths ranging from 3,100 to 2,700 metres (10,170–8,858 ft).

== See also ==
- List of volcanoes in Indonesia
