= Grabno, Pomeranian Voivodeship =

Grabno
- Village
- Location within Poland
- Coordinates: 54°33′37″N 16°54′40″E
- Country: Poland
- Voivodeship: Pomeranian
- County: Słupsk
- Gmina: Ustka
- Population: 168

Grabno [ˈɡrabnɔ] (German: Wintershagen) is a village in the administrative district of Gmina Ustka, within Słupsk County, Pomeranian Voivodeship, in northern Poland.

For the history of the region, see History of Pomerania.
