= Duninówko =

Settlement in Poland

- Colony
- Location within Poland
- Coordinates: 54°31′33″N 16°50′39″E
- Country: Poland
- Voivodeship: Pomeranian
- County: Słupsk
- Gmina: Ustka
- Population: 50

Duninówko [duniˈnufkɔ] is a colony in the administrative district of Gmina Ustka, within Słupsk County, Pomeranian Voivodeship, in northern Poland.

For the history of the region, see History of Pomerania.
