= Mącznik, Pomeranian Voivodeship =

Mącznik
- Settlement
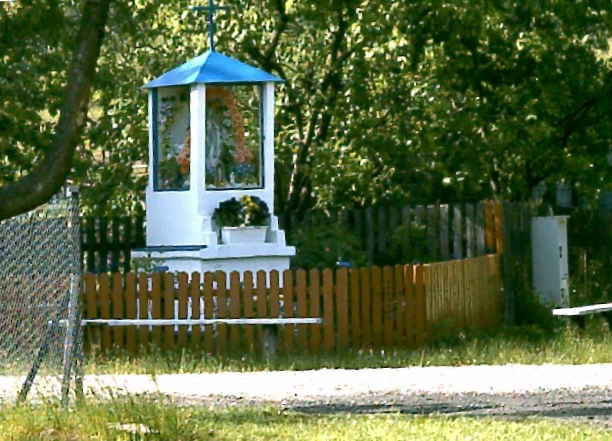
- Wayside shrine in Mącznik

- Location within Poland
- Coordinates: 54°22′47″N 16°58′45″E
- Country: Poland
- Voivodeship: Pomeranian
- County: Słupsk
- Gmina: Ustka

Mącznik [ˈmɔnt͡ʂnik] is a settlement in the administrative district of Gmina Ustka, within Słupsk County, Pomeranian Voivodeship, in northern Poland.

For the history of the region, see History of Pomerania.
