= Rówek =

- Settlement
- Location within Poland
- Coordinates: 54°40′7″N 17°3′9″E
- Country: Poland
- Voivodeship: Pomeranian
- County: Słupsk
- Gmina: Ustka

Rówek [ˈruvɛk] is a settlement in the administrative district of Gmina Ustka, within Słupsk County, Pomeranian Voivodeship, in northern Poland.
