= Dominek =

- Village
- Location within Poland
- Coordinates: 54°35′8″N 17°6′22″E
- Country: Poland
- Voivodeship: Pomeranian
- County: Słupsk
- Gmina: Ustka
- Population: 120
- Postal code: 76-211

Dominek [dɔˈminɛk] is a village in the administrative district of Gmina Ustka, within Słupsk County, Pomeranian Voivodeship, in northern Poland.
