= Emperor of China (volcano) =

Submarine volcano in the western part of the Banda Sea, Indonesia

- Summit depth: 2,850 m (9,350 ft)

Location
- Location: Banda Sea
- Coordinates: 6°37′S 124°13′E
- Country: Indonesia

Geology
- Type: Submarine volcano?
- Last eruption: 1927?

Emperor of China is a submarine volcano in the western part of the Banda Sea, Indonesia. This volcano is part of a chain with Nieuwerkerk volcano, known scientifically as the Emperor of China–Nieuwkerk (NEC) ridge, the depth of which is ranging from 3,100–2,700 metres (10,170–8,858 ft).

The NEC ridge is lying on Damar Basin, a sea basin of which has 1–2 km Pliocene–Quaternary sediment thickness and is topologically flat. Damar Basin is located in Banda Sea, which is bounded by East Sunda and Banda volcanic arcs within the area of three major plates, namely Eurasian, Pacific and Indo-Australian plates; all of the three plates have been actively converging since Mesozoic times.

The two submarine volcanoes (the Emperor of China and Nieuwerkerk) are located at both ends of the NEC ridge, and they were active. Based on the geological and geochemical study, Emperor of China, Nieuwekerk, another ridge in the Banda Sea called Lucipara, and the Wetar segment were a single volcanic arc around 8–7 Ma ago. The volcanic activity was related to the subduction of the Indian oceanic lithosphere beneath the Australia continental block. From a survey conducted in 1979, both Emperor of China and Nieuwerkerk have been defined as extinct based on their structural settings and their age, which is stated that the volcanic activity was estimated stopped after 7 Ma ago. The end of magmatic activity in the NEC ridge at 3 Ma is thought of as the result from the collision of Timor and the Wetar segment of the Sunda Arc.

== See also ==
- List of volcanoes in Indonesia
