= Gmina Ustka =

Gmina Ustka Ustka Commune
- Gmina
- Flag Coat of arms
- Interactive map of Gmina Ustka
- Coordinates (Ustka): 54°35′N 16°51′E
- Country: Poland
- Voivodeship: Pomeranian
- County: Słupsk County
- Seat: Ustka

Area
  - Total: 218.1 km^{2} (84.2 sq mi)

Population (2006)
  - Total: 7,335
  - Density: 33.63/km^{2} (87.10/sq mi)
- Website: http://www.ustka.ug.gov.pl

Gmina Ustka is a rural gmina (administrative district) in Słupsk County, Pomeranian Voivodeship, in northern Poland. Its seat is the town of Ustka, although the town is not part of the territory of the gmina.

The gmina covers an area of 218.1 square kilometres (84.2 sq mi), and as of 2006 its total population is 7,335.

== Villages ==
Gmina Ustka contains the following villages and settlements:

- Bałamątek
- Bałamątek
- Charnowo
- Dalimierz Przewłocki
- Dębina
- Dominek
- Duninówko
- Duninowo
- Duninowo-Kolonia
- Gąbino
- Gąbino-Kolonia
- Golęcino
- Grabno
- Krężołki
- Lędowo
- Lędowo-Osiedle
- Machowinko
- Machowino
- Mącznik
- Masłowo
- Modła
- Modlinek
- Możdżanowo
- Niestkowo
- Niestkowo-Kolonia
- Objazda
- Objazda-Kolonia
- Orzechowo
- Osieki Słupskie
- Owczary
- Pęplin
- Pęplinko
- Pęplino
- Pęplino-Kolonia
- Poddąbie
- Przewłoczki
- Przewłoka
- Redwanki
- Rówek
- Rowy
- Smużki
- Starkowo
- Starkowo-Kolonia
- Wodnica
- Wodnica-Kolonia
- Wytowno
- Wytowno-Kolonia
- Żabiniec
- Zabłocie
- Zalesin
- Zaleskie
- Zapadłe
- Zimowiska.

== Neighbouring gminas ==
Gmina Ustka is bordered by the town of Ustka and by the gminas of Postomino, Słupsk and Smołdzino.
