= Golęcino, Pomeranian Voivodeship =

Settlement in Poland

Golęcino
- Colony
- Location within Poland
- Coordinates: 54°31′20″N 16°48′14″E
- Country: Poland
- Voivodeship: Pomeranian
- County: Słupsk
- Gmina: Ustka
- Population: 27

Golęcino [ɡɔlɛnˈt͡ɕinɔ] is a colony in the administrative district of Gmina Ustka, within Słupsk County, Pomeranian Voivodeship, in northern Poland.

For the history of the region, see History of Pomerania.
