= Church of the Divine Mercy =

Church of the Divine Mercy may refer to:

- Church of Divine Mercy, Penang, Malaysia
- Church of the Divine Mercy, Bydgoszcz, Poland
- Divine Mercy Church, Prudnik, Poland
- Divine Mercy Church, Kalisz, Poland
- Church of Divine Mercy, Pasir Ris, Singapore

== See also ==
- Divine Mercy Sanctuary (disambiguation)
- Temple of Mercy and Charity, Płock, Poland
- Shrine of St. Faustina (Warsaw), Poland
