= Divine Mercy Sanctuary =

Divine Mercy Sanctuary may refer to:

- Divine Mercy Sanctuary, Kraków, with the remains of saint Faustina Kowalska and the most popular Divine Mercy image by Adolf Hyła
- Sanctuary of the Divine Mercy, Vilnius, with the first Divine Mercy image by Eugeniusz Kazimirowski
- Divine Mercy Sanctuary (Płock), the place of the first apparition of the Jesus, I trust in You image
- Divine Mercy Sanctuary (Białystok), where blessed Michał Sopoćko is buried
- Głogowiec, Łęczyca County, where saint Faustina Kowalska was born, and nearby Świnice Warckie, where she was baptized
- Santo Spirito in Sassia, Rome
- National Shrine of The Divine Mercy (Stockbridge, Massachusetts)
- National Shrine of The Divine Mercy, Philippines
- Divine Mercy Shrine (Misamis Oriental), Philippines

== See also ==
- Church of the Divine Mercy (disambiguation)
