= Church of the Divine Mercy, Bydgoszcz =

20th-century Catholic church in Bydgoszcz, Poland

Coordinates: 53°07′43″N 17°58′36″E

Church of the Divine Mercy
- Polish: Kościół Miłosierdzia Bożego w Bydgoszczy
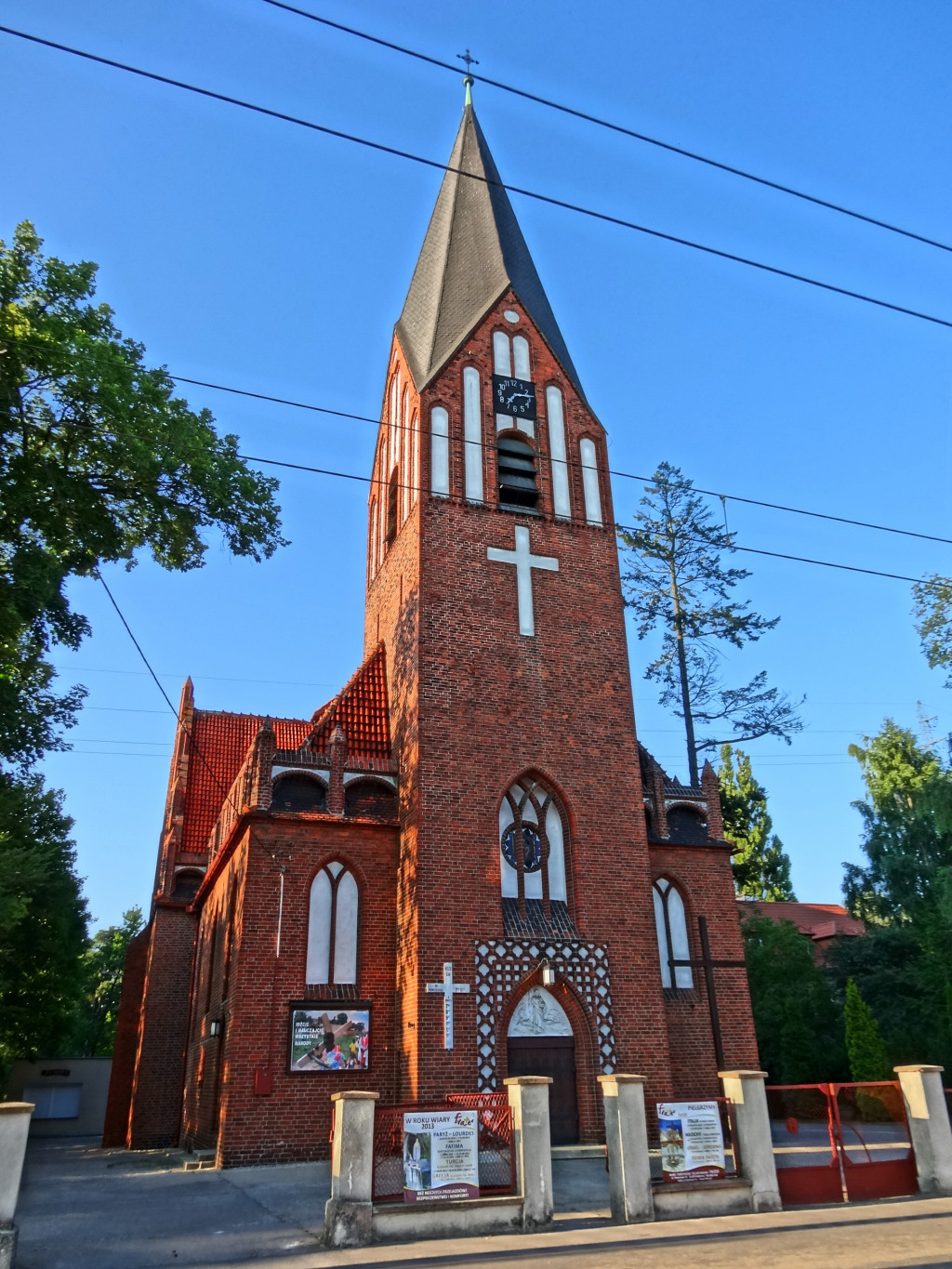
- Church of the Divine Mercy, Bydgoszcz
- Church of the Divine Mercy
- Location: 68 Nakielska street, Bydgoszcz
- Country: Poland
- Denomination: Catholic Church
- Website: https://www.milosierdzie.bydgoszcz.pl/

History
- Status: Church
- Dedication: Divine Mercy
- Dedicated: 1906

Architecture
- Functional status: Active
- Heritage designation: Nr. A/1354, 26 February 2008
- Architect: Ismaar Hermann
- Architectural type: Neo-Gothic
- Completed: 1906

Specifications
- Materials: brick

The Church of the Divine Mercy is a Catholic church in Bydgoszcz, Poland. It is located at 68 Nakielska street in the district of Wilczak, 200 metres (660 ft) south of the Bydgoszcz Canal. The building has been registered on the Kuyavian–Pomeranian Voivodeship Heritage list since 10 June 1998 (Nr. A-507/1).

== History ==
The construction of the church took place in the context of the intensive development of Protestant religious buildings in Bydgoszcz (then Bromberg) and its suburbs at the end of the 19th century and the beginning of the 20th century. At that time, there were already eight Protestant churches in the area, mostly in the red brick Neo-Gothic style.

The Evangelical-Unionist community of the village of Wilczak (then Printzenthal) was subordinated to the parish of the Okole village, on the northern side of the Bydgoszcz Canal. From 1898 on, Wilczak parishioners began to champion the creation of their own parish. The latter was established in 1900: it comprised the communes of Wilczak, Miedzyń, and part of Prądy.

A plot of land was subsequently obtained, between Nakielska Street (then called Nakelerstraße ) and the Bydgoszcz Canal. There, a pastor's house (currently non existent) was built (1902–1904). The community did not stop there, as the ultimate goal was to get approval to erect a church on this parcel. The efforts were rewarded, thanks to the combined activities of the first parish priest, Bótticher and the influential members composing the parish council: Mr Mertens, a railway secretary, and Mr Liptau, one of the district board members.

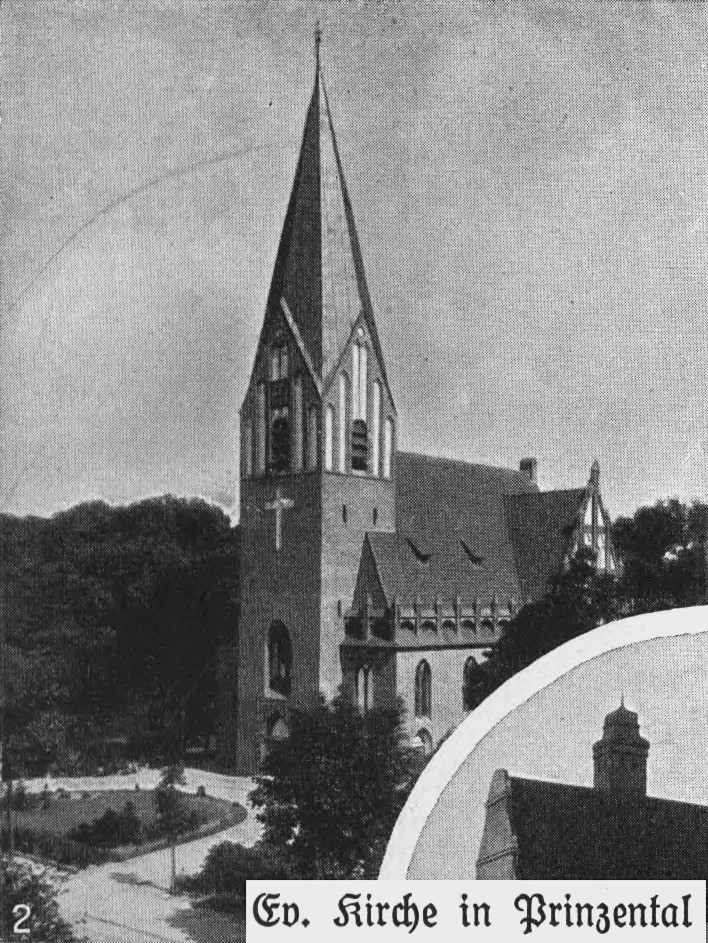
The Evangelic temple in 1911

Ismar Hermann, then Prussian royal district construction inspector, penned the design of the temple in 1904. Submitted to Berlin authorities, it was approved at the Ministry of Public Works by Oskar Hossfeld, the architect and supervisor of all religious construction work in the Prussian Empire. Oskar Hossfeld was also the designer of the Church of the Sacred Heart of Jesus in Bydgoszcz in 1913.

Remarkably, the same duo of architects (Hermann and Hossfeld) worked simultaneously on the design for the now-defunct Martin Luther Church in the parish of Szwederowo. The contractor for both edifices was Bydgoszcz builder businessman Carl Rose. The main body of Wilczak church was completed in 1905 and the final construction continued through the year 1906.

The church served the German community of the Evangelical-Union Church until 1945, though the parish and its congregation ceased to flourish at the outbreak of World War I. During the interwar, its activity slowly decreased, following the reduction of the size of all Protestant communities in the city. Pastor Hans Staffehl was the last parish priest from the 1930s (and presumably until 1945), leading at the same time Wilczak and Okole parishes.

After WWII and the withdrawal of German citizens from Bydgoszcz, the church was devastated. On 2 February 1945, the city authorities transferred its management to the parish of the Holy Trinity Church in Bydgoszcz, in order to adapt the temple for Catholic use. Its consecration took place on 15 June 1945. Initially, the edifice was used as a branch church for the residents of the districts of Wilczak and Jara. On 24 August 1946, Cardinal August Hlond issued a decree establishing the Parish of the Divine Mercy, and on 1 October 1946, Father Feliks Małecki became the first parish priest; he held this position till 1982.

The church interiors had to be adjusted for the practice of the Catholic liturgy with:

- new furniture;
- a new pipe organ;
- one main oak altar depicting Merciful Jesus, Andrew Bobola and Mary Magdalene, by sculptor Kazimierz Lipiński, (unveiled on 7 December 1947);
- two side altars devoted to Our Lady of the Gate of Dawn and to St. St. Anthony, also created by sculptor Kazimierz Lipiński;
- five confessionals.

Lipiński additionally created a statue of the Sacred Heart of Jesus. Side galleries were closed, only the one above the main entrance was kept.

A rectory was built between 1957 and 1961. In 1964, the existing outbuilding behind the church was converted into a catechetical facility.

The current exterior of the church remains unchanged from its original design. Only an ornately landscaped area around the church parvise and a park surrounding the edifice have ceased to exist: they used to stretch with regularly marked paths and extensive lawns towards the Bydgoszcz Canal.

== Architecture ==
The church was built in the Neo-Gothic style, rather popular in Prussian Bydgoszcz for religious architecture at the beginning of the 20th century.

=== Exteriors ===
The edifice is basilica-shaped, measuring 34.9 metres (115 ft) by 18.4 metres (60 ft). It has a north-facing Latin cross footprint with three chancels.

The main body of the church consists of a wide nave, an extended chancel and a transept with limited extension. The facade is dominated by a massive tower topped with a tall 6-faces roof. Atop the tower, covered by a gable roof, stands a clock.

The church's frontages are highly decorated, displaying a mix of apertures, blind traceries, friezes and pinnacles. The Neo-Gothic character of the building is underlined by stepped buttresses which support the external walls of the transept. The overall impression is reinforced by the contrast between the red brick walls and the white plastered elements.

The front façade features a pointed-arched portal with a bas-relief in the tympanum depicting Christ the Good Shepherd, crowned by a mosaic portraying the Black Madonna of Częstochowa. The main entrance door, highly decorated, exhibits preserved wrought-iron hinges and a lock adorned with floral motifs.

=== Interiors ===
The church's original galleries were removed after 1945, except for the segments located above the entrance. A wooden coffered ceiling can be seen in the main nave: in 2022, a renovation of the polychrome was completed. On the side naves, ceilings are not adorned.

The chancel is covered with a stellar vault. The Evangelist past of the church still survives in the design of the pulpit with polychrome scenes on its panels and a baptismal font.

The stained glass windows in the central nave body were designed by Redmerski in 1984 and are reminiscent of the original prewar ones. In the chancel stand two older stained glass windows, dating from 1949. They were created by Bydgoszcz artist Edward Kwiatkowski.

In the tower, the main bell still dates back from the foundation of the Prussian church. Cast in 1905 at Franz Schilling's workshop in Apolda, the inscriptions in German indicate that Wilhelm II's wife, Empress Augusta Victoria of Schleswig-Holstein, was a protector of the church (Protectorin dieser Kirche Ihre majestaet die kaiserin Auguste Viktoria).

== Gallery ==
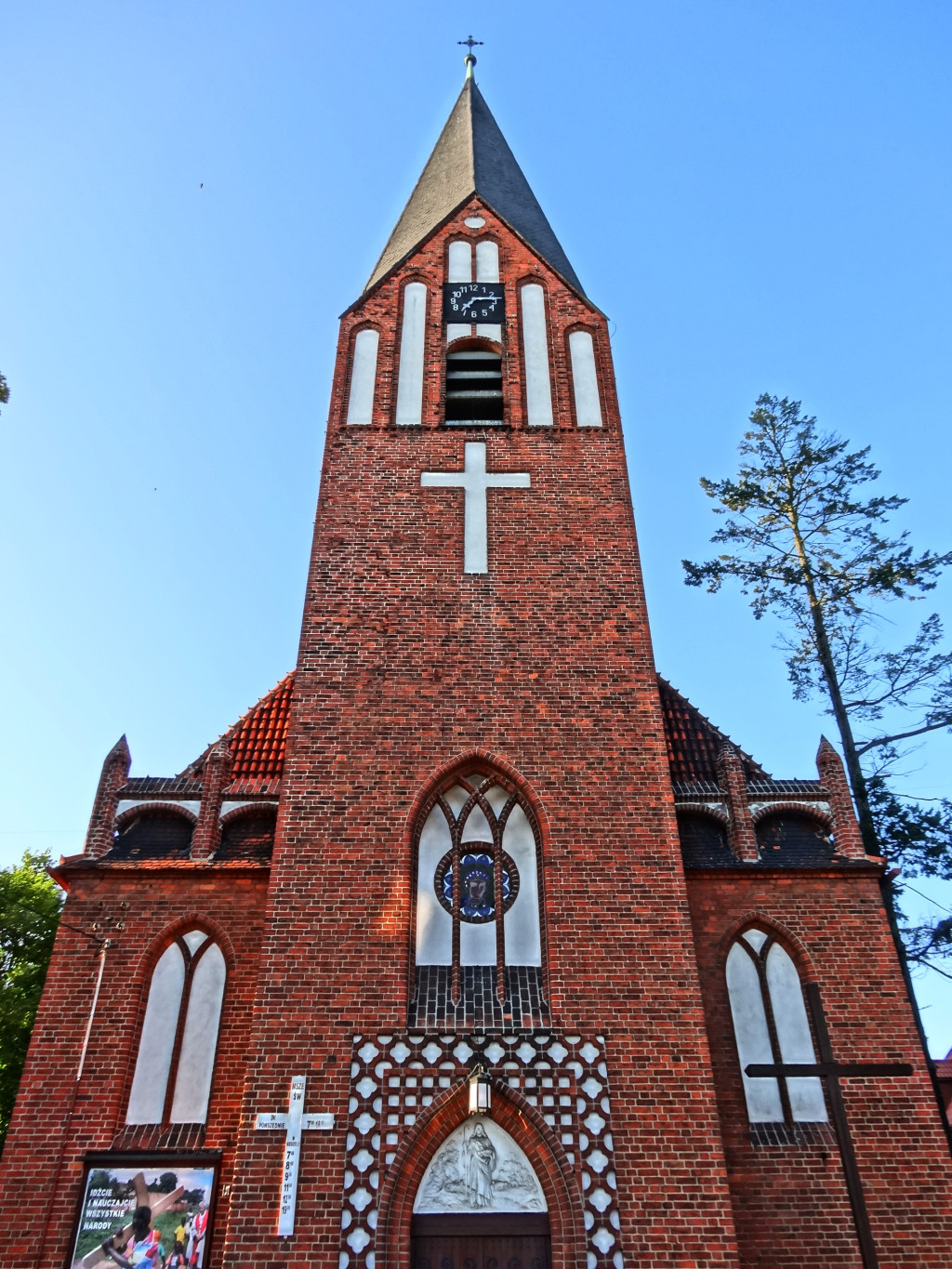
Church tower and portal

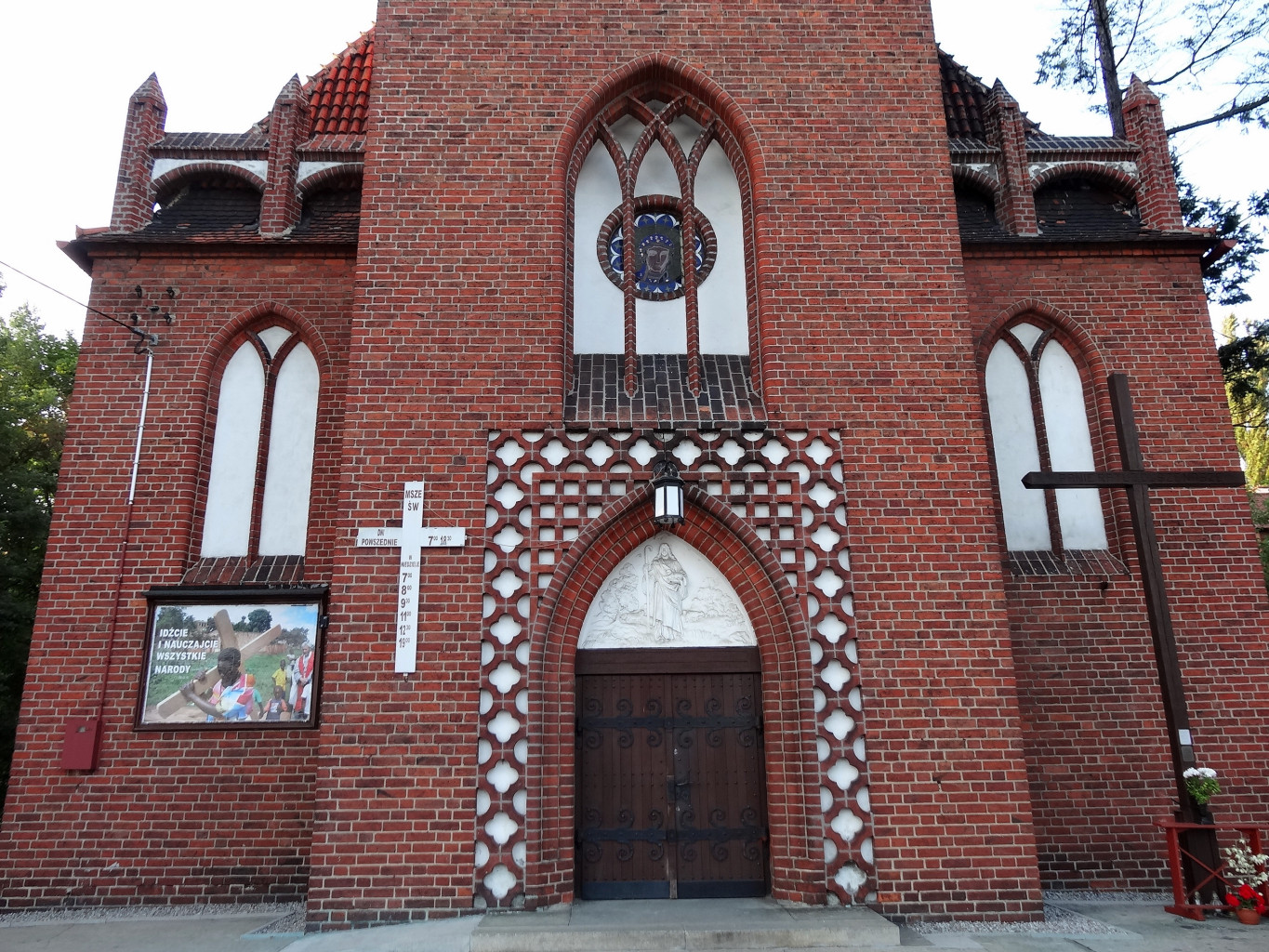
Adorned portal

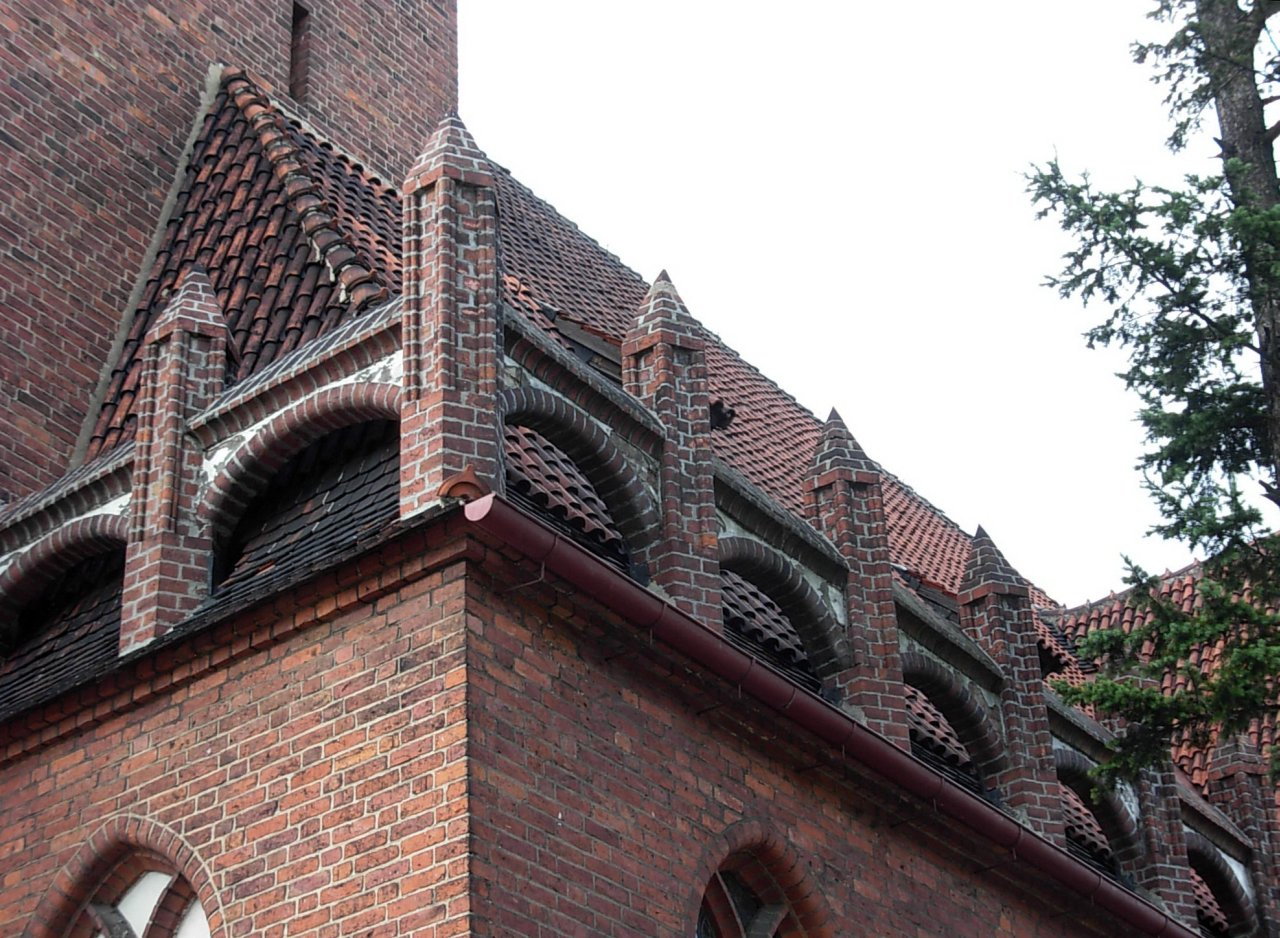
Pilasters

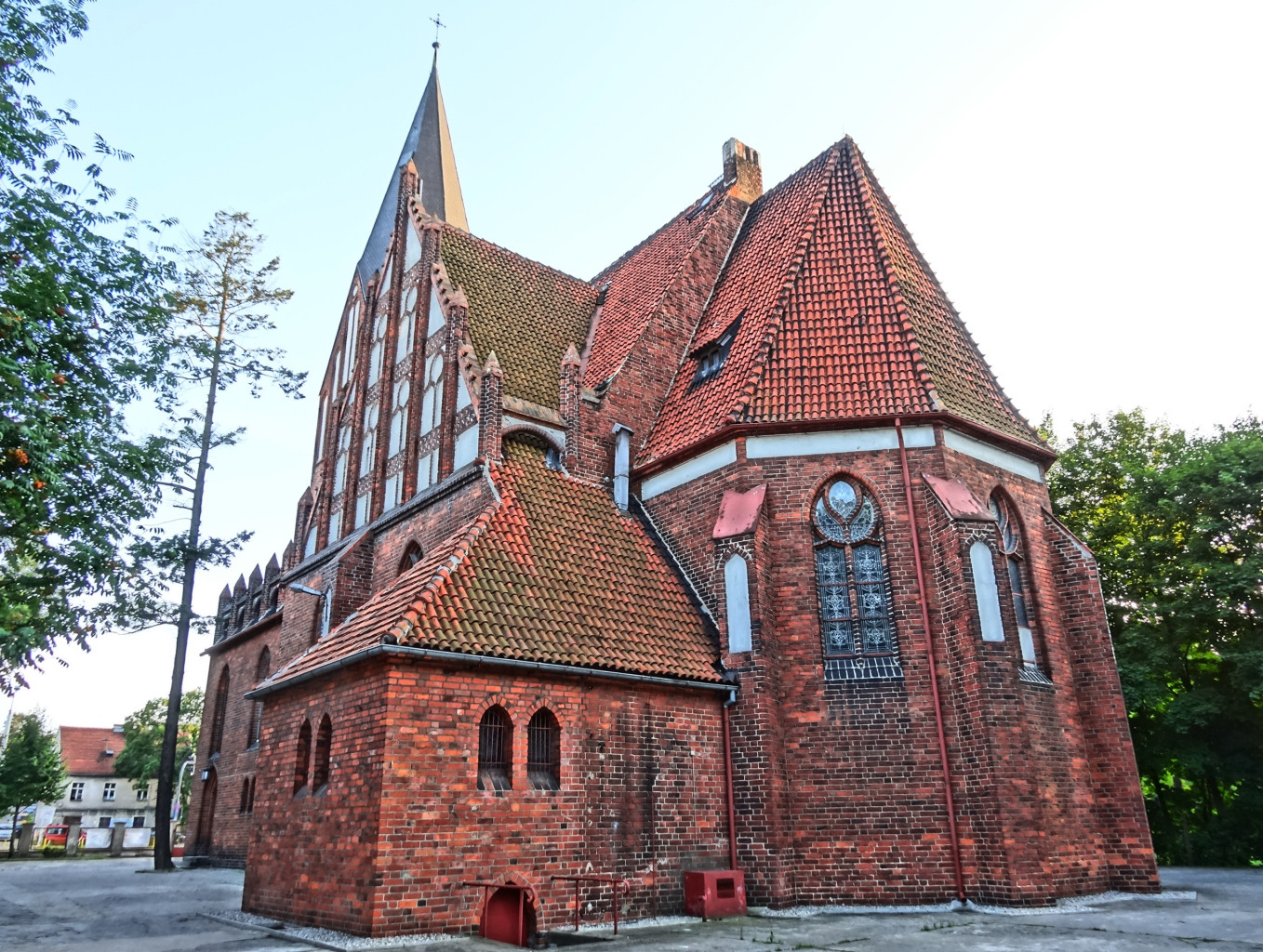
Outside view of the chancel

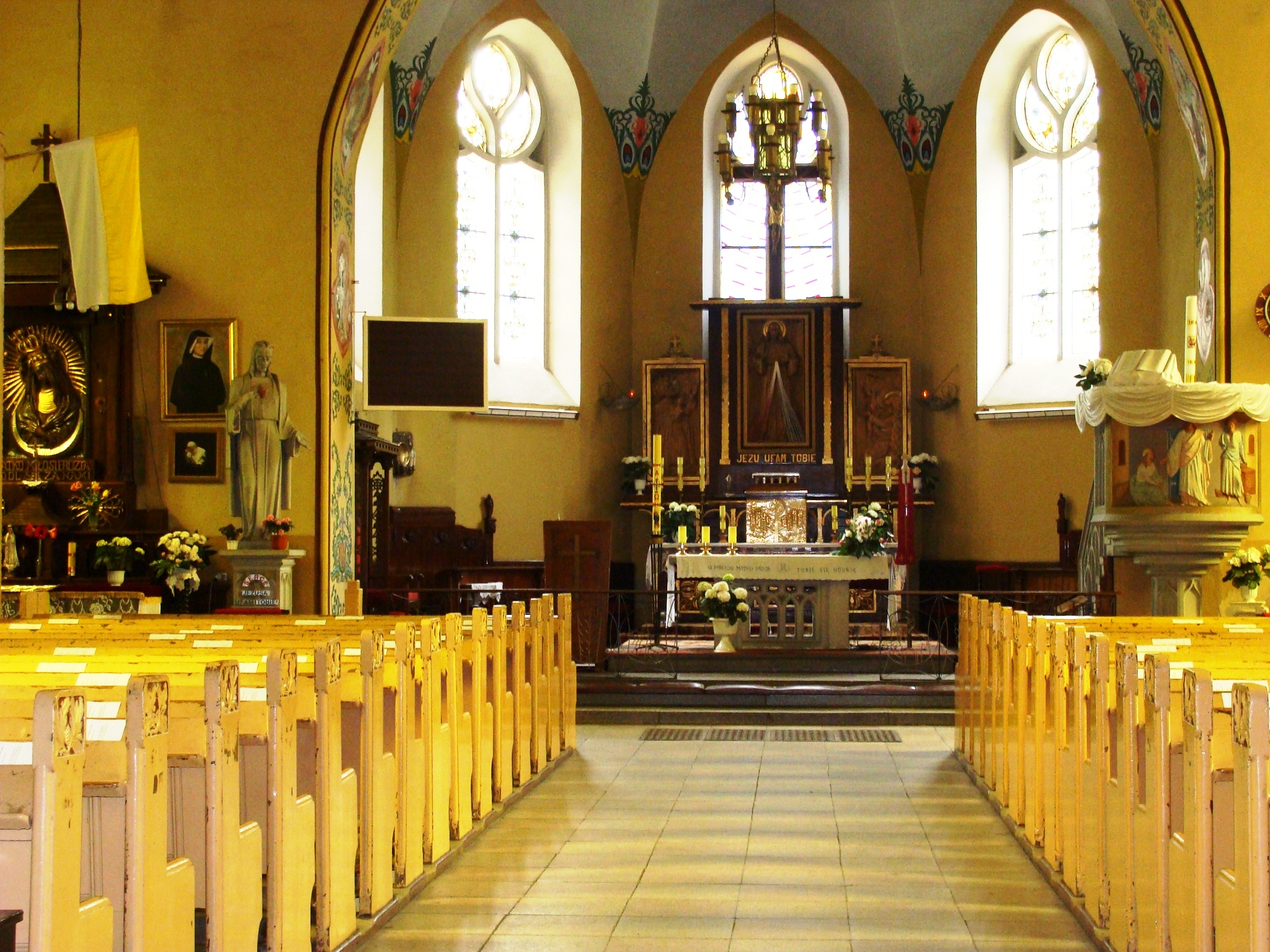
View of the nave

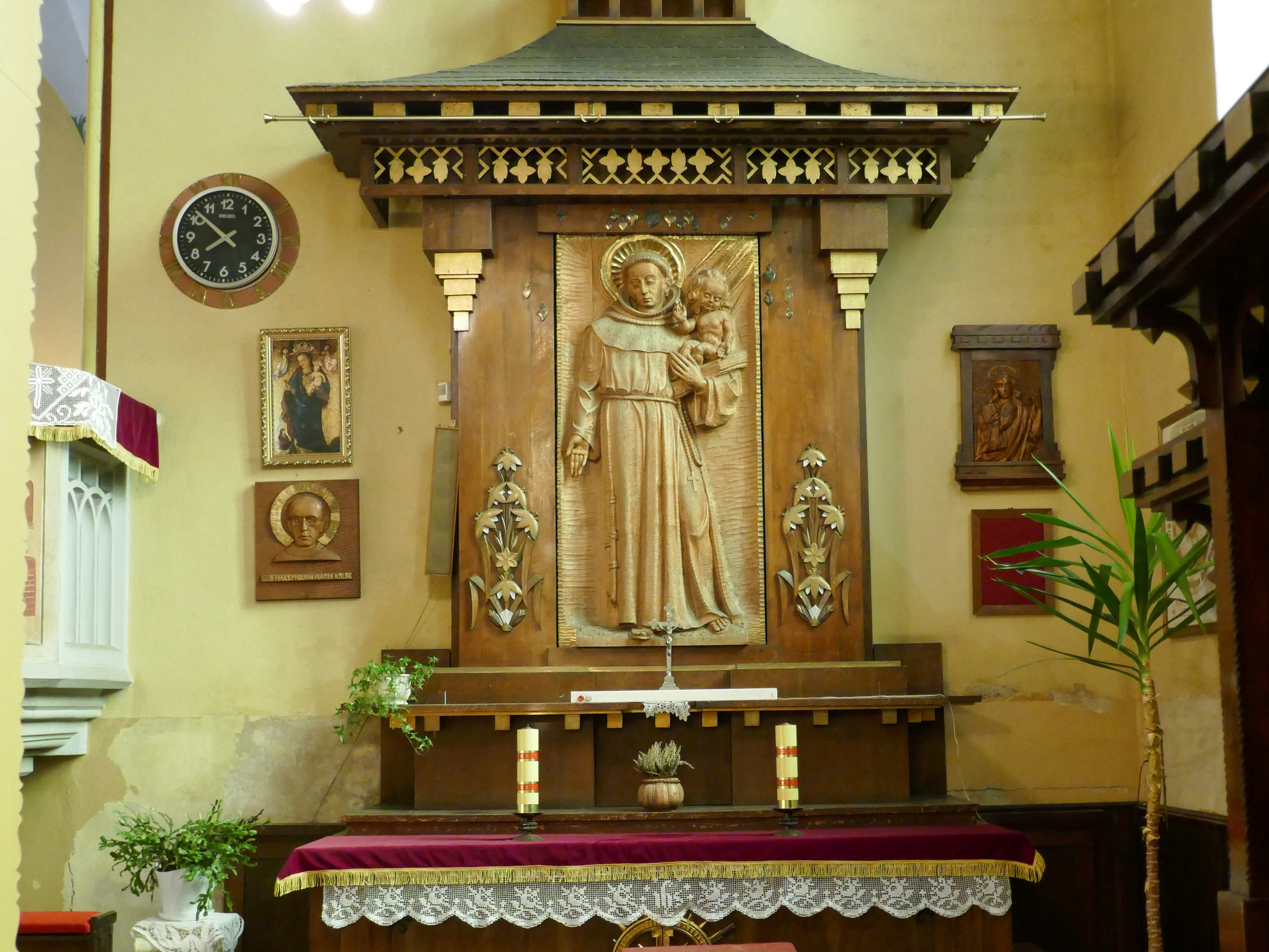
Side altar dedicated to St. Anthony of Padua

== See also ==
- Bydgoszcz
- Bydgoszcz Canal
- Nakielska Street, Bydgoszcz
- Church of the Sacred Heart of Jesus, Bydgoszcz
- Church of the Holy Trinity, Bydgoszcz
- Bydgoszcz Architects (1850–1970s)
- Okole district, Bydgoszcz

== Bibliography ==
- Parucka, Krystyna (2008). Zabytki Bydgoszczy – minikatalog [Monuments of Bydgoszcz – mini-catalogue.] (in Polish). Bydgoszcz: Tifen.
- Derenda, Jerzy (2006). Piękna stara Bydgoszcz – tom I z serii Bydgoszcz miasto na Kujawach. Praca zbiorowa [Beautiful Old Bydgoszcz – Volume I of the series Bydgoszcz, a city in Kujawy. Collective work.] (in Polish). Bydgoszcz: Towarzystwo Miłośników Miasta Bydgoszczy.
- Kuberska, Inga (1998). Architektura sakralna Bydgoszczy w okresie historyzmu. Materiały do dziejów kultury i sztuki Bydgoszczy i regionu. Zeszyt 3 [Bydgoszcz's sacred architecture in the historicist period. [century] Materials for the history of culture and art in Bydgoszcz and the region. Issue 3] (in Polish). Bydgoszcz: PRACOWNIA DOKUMENTACJI I POPULARYZACJI ZABYTKÓW WOJEWÓDZKIEGO OŚRODKA KULTURY W BYDGOSZCZY. pp. 61–82.
- Derkowska-Kostkowska, Bogna; Winter, Piotr (1998). Z historii zboru ewangelickiego na Wilczaku. Kalendarz Bydgoski [From the history of the Evangelical congregation in Wilczak. Bydgoszcz Calendar] (in Polish). Bydgoszcz: Towarzystwo Miłośników Miasta Bydgoszczy. pp. 219–225.
