= Shrine of St. Faustina, Warsaw =

Church building in Warsaw, Poland

Coordinates: 52°14′24.09″N 20°59′01.31″E

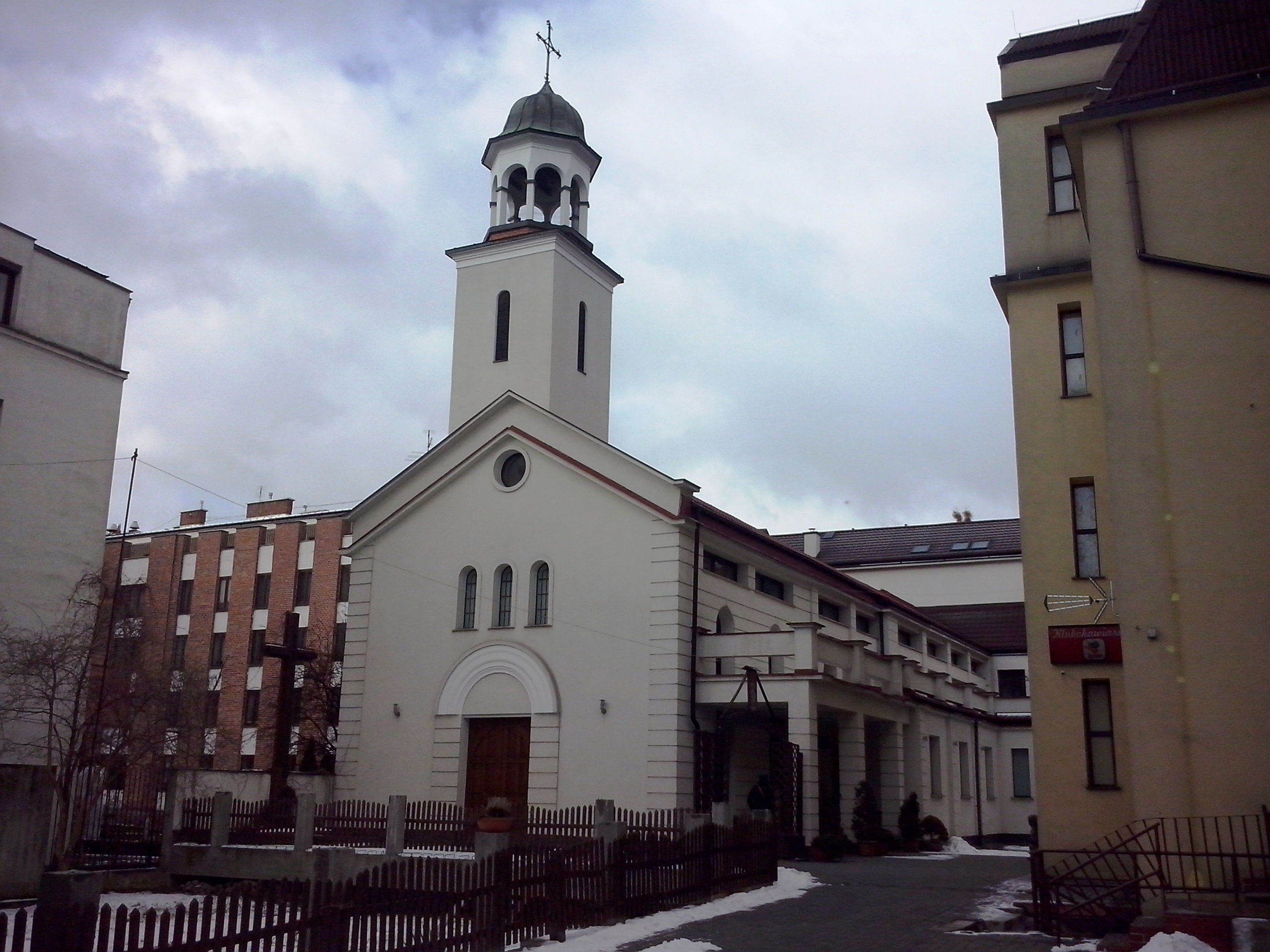
Shrine of St. Faustina, front entrance

The Shrine of St. Faustina (Polish: Sanktuarium św. Faustyny) is a Roman Catholic church located in Warsaw; it is the center of the Divine Mercy and St. Faustina Parish. From 1863 to 1944 the building served as internal chapel within the Sisters of Our Lady of Mercy monastery compound; destroyed during the Warsaw Uprising, it remained a ruin until the early 21st century, when it was brought to the current condition. The church and its immediate surroundings gained nationwide fame in the 1980s; the premises became the hub of independent art, strongly flavored with opposition to the official political regime. Currently the church is known mostly as related to Saint Faustina, who entered the neighboring monastery in 1925.

== Conventual chapel ==
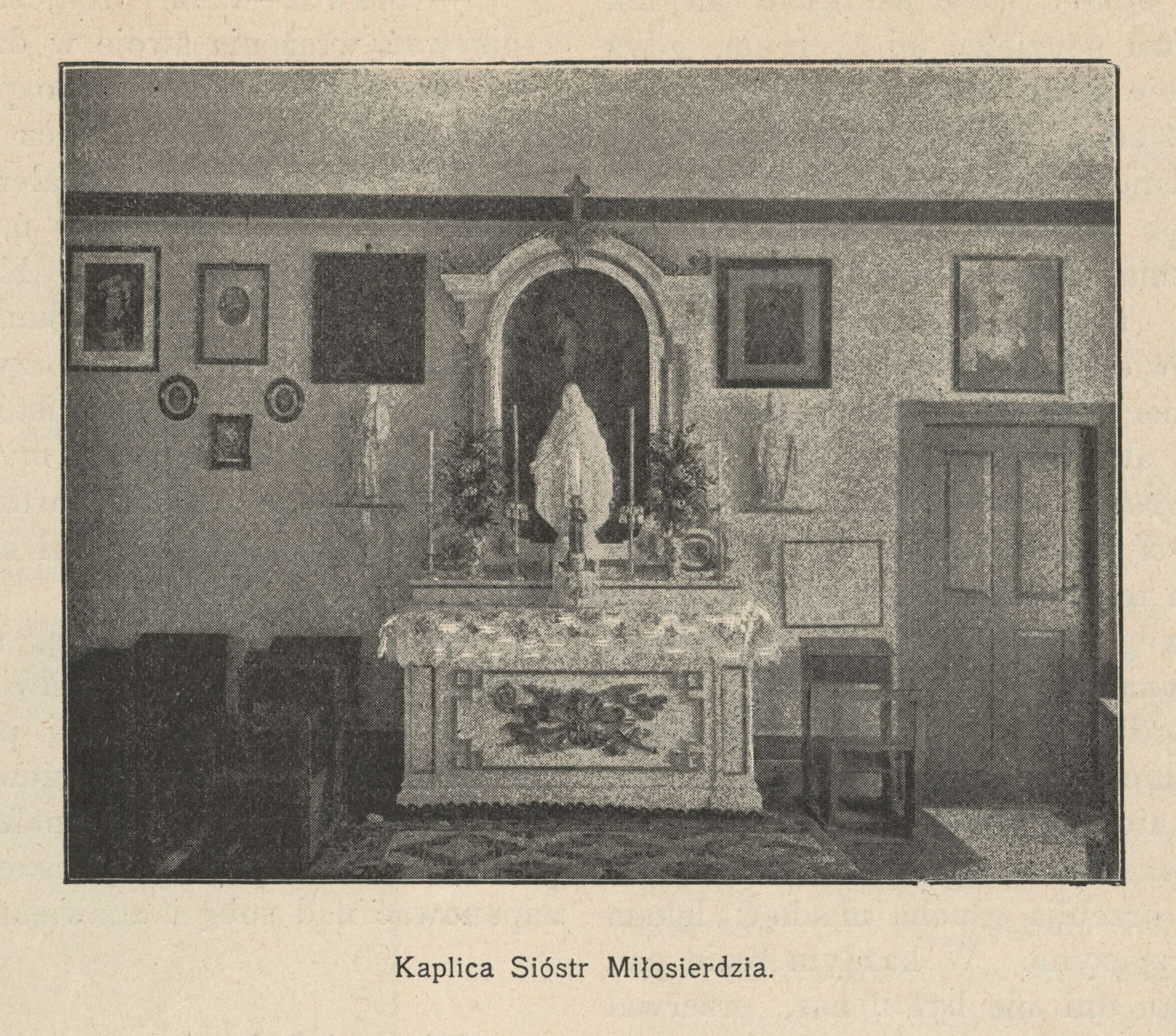
chapel, 1899

A large plot framed by Żelazna, Żytnia and Wronia streets in the then half-rural part of the Wola district was purchased by archbishop of Warsaw Zygmunt Szczęsny Feliński from Ksawery Pusłowski in 1862. The same year he transferred Western part of the plot to congregation of Sisters of Our Lady of Mercy, the order freshly founded in Warsaw with the intention to provide assistance to troubled girls, commonly known as "magdalenki". Upon settling at the estate the Sisters adopted an existing wooden manor as a chapel; it was consecrated on November 1, 1862. The task of developing the monastery coincided with outbreak of the January Uprising and ensuing Russian crackdown on perceived foci of rebellion; the measures applied were directed also against the Roman-Catholic Church and religious orders. The Sisters dodged administrative restrictions by going into semi-clandestine status and the monastery posed as "charity and relief house".

In 1873 the abbess mother Teresa, in private countess Ewa Potocka, dedicated her own money to construction of a new chapel. It was designed by Władysław Kosmowski, an architect involved in a number of religious projects in Warsaw. Made of bricks and replacing the previous wooden construction, the new chapel was outlined as a rather modest building. To deceive the Russian administration the small, 8x17m rectangular one-nave building was covered with a flat roof; main entrance was from an internal yard and a small apse, reaching towards the Żytnia street, was camouflaged wrapped within residential premises. The interior is described as adhering to a neo-Romanesque style, though there is no photographic evidence remaining.

The chapel kept serving the Sisters of Our Lady of Mercy and their protégés, "fallen and neglected girls", boarded in a dedicated ward; outsiders were admitted only once in a year, on Easter. The best-known Polish mystic later to be known as St. Faustina entered the convent in 1925 and lived there on the on-and-off basis until 1933. There were no major architectural changes registered for 63 years, though it is likely that during this period the interior décor was being systematically adjusted; its main feature was an old copy of Black Madonna of Częstochowa painting. The building underwent major refurbishment in 1936–1938. The main nave was extended by few meters, an aisle was added along the Western wall, the chancel was slightly broadened and a bell-tower was built next to the South-Western corner of the temple; the chapel turned into a small church and as such is referred to in some sources.

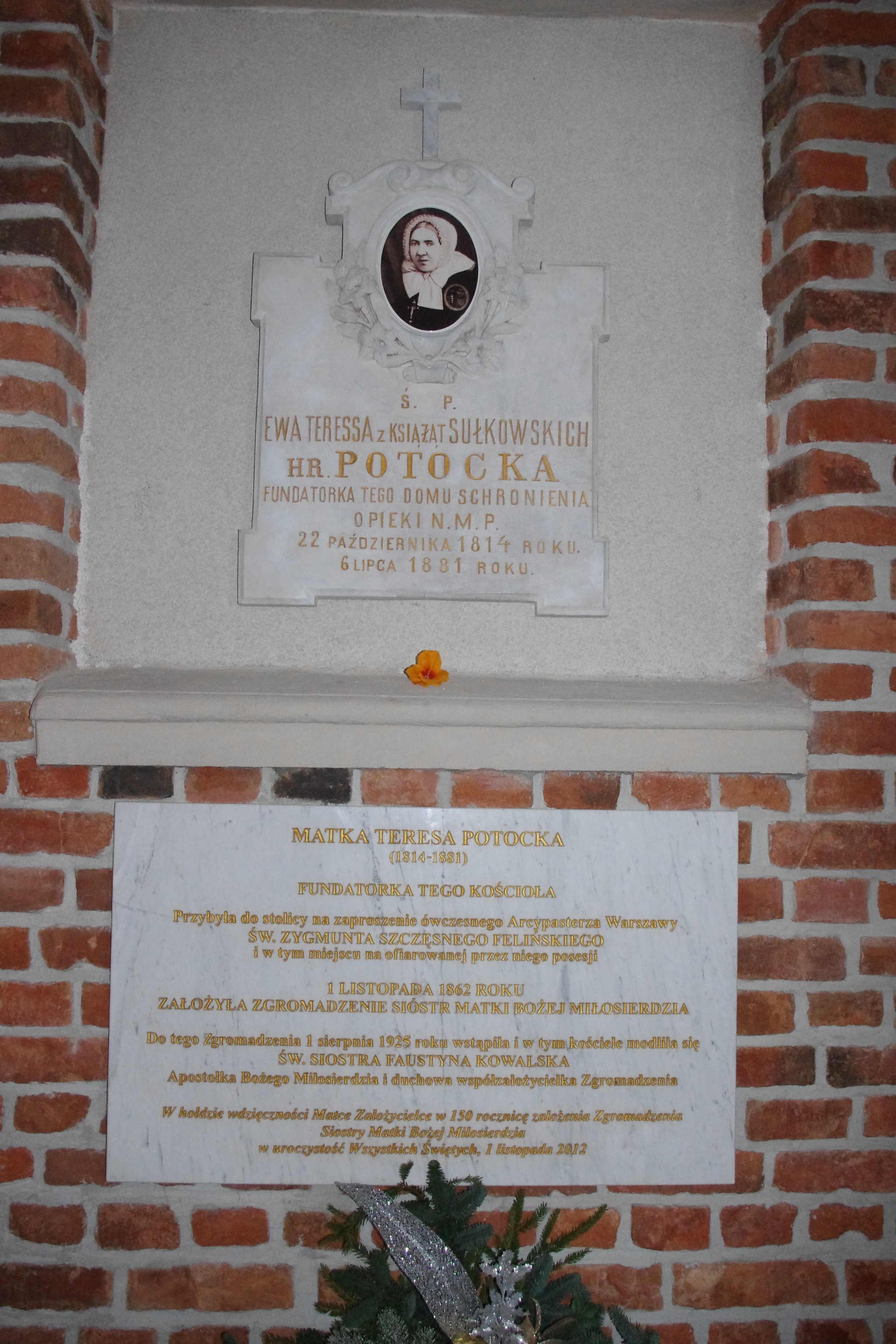
Plaque to Potocka

In course of the battle of Warsaw in 1939 the Sisters cared to soldiers wounded in combat. During the Nazi rule the compound kept serving its original purpose and unlike in case of many other religious orders, the Sisters have not been evicted. Since 1940 the buildings were in immediate vicinity of the Ghetto wall; there are known cases of fleeing Jewish girls either assisted or going into hiding in the monastery. On August 2, 1944, during the second day of the Warsaw Uprising, the Sisters admitted into their premises detachments of the Parasol battalion, the insurgent unit which controlled the area; the rebels took part in the afternoon mass in the church.

German troops captured the area on August 9, 1944; none of the sources consulted clarifies whether the chapel or the monastery was damaged during combat. The Nazis evicted all Sisters and their 200 protégés, herding them towards a concentration camp; one nun was shot at the spot for refusing to leave. Soon afterwards the entire compound was purposely burnt down by the Germans. The church lost all wooden and metal equipment, including interior and the roof; what was left was charred, partially damaged walls.

== Ruin ==
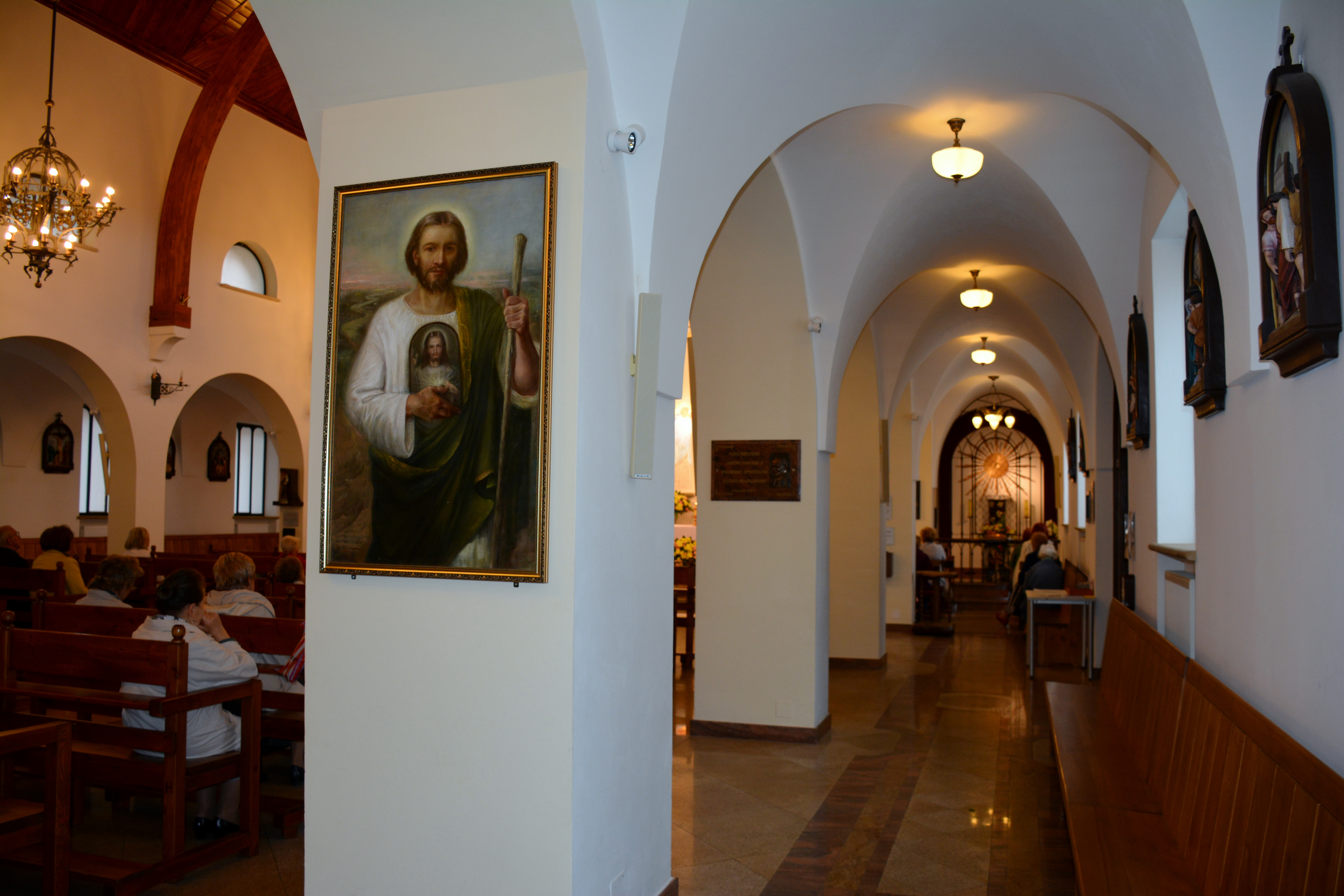
eastern aisle, current view

After the war, and for several decades, the compound remained a fenced moonscape, hosting ruins, half-demolished houses, and provisional wooden structures. Some of the buildings were subject to further destruction as bricks and other construction materials were pilfered by city residents trying to rebuild around it. Once the Sisters of Our Lady of Mercy managed to re-claim the plot, they focused conservation efforts on the main convent building and the ward. The authorities refused to grant the building permit needed to commence reconstruction of the church; for their own needs the Sisters arranged for one of the larger rooms in the neighboring convent house to serve as a chapel. Over time the site, including the church ruins, became overgrown with self-sown trees, their branches gradually reaching over the roofless walls. Until the early 1970s, the dilapidated ruins were the only pre-war Warsaw temple which had not been restored. The compound and surrounding quarter stood out among neighboring sections, developed with large condo-type residential buildings.

In 1973 the ruins attracted attention of Rev. Wojciech Czarnowski (1940–2019), a young priest commissioned to provide spiritual service to the Sisters of Our Lady of Mercy monastery. Just prior to Easter of 1973, and aided by few locals, he broke into the fenced and closed-off site and on the hastily ordered porch said mass for the first time in 29 years. During the next year, Czarnowski and his men were removing debris, cutting down vegetation and provisionally insulating the walls; the work —technically illegal given the off-limits status of the plot and inherent danger of the site— was crowned with mounting transparent PVC sheets as a provisional roof. Simultaneously, the archbishopric office renewed attempts to obtain the building permit, finally granted just prior to Easter 1974. In April 1974, the site was visited by the primate Stefan Wyszyński, who consecrated the church and named it after the Divine Mercy. In 1977, the office for historical monuments, previously uninterested in the building, formally approved of refurbishment— though actual terms remained unclear; according to some sources walls were to be kept intact, according to others interior was to "retain traces of the past".

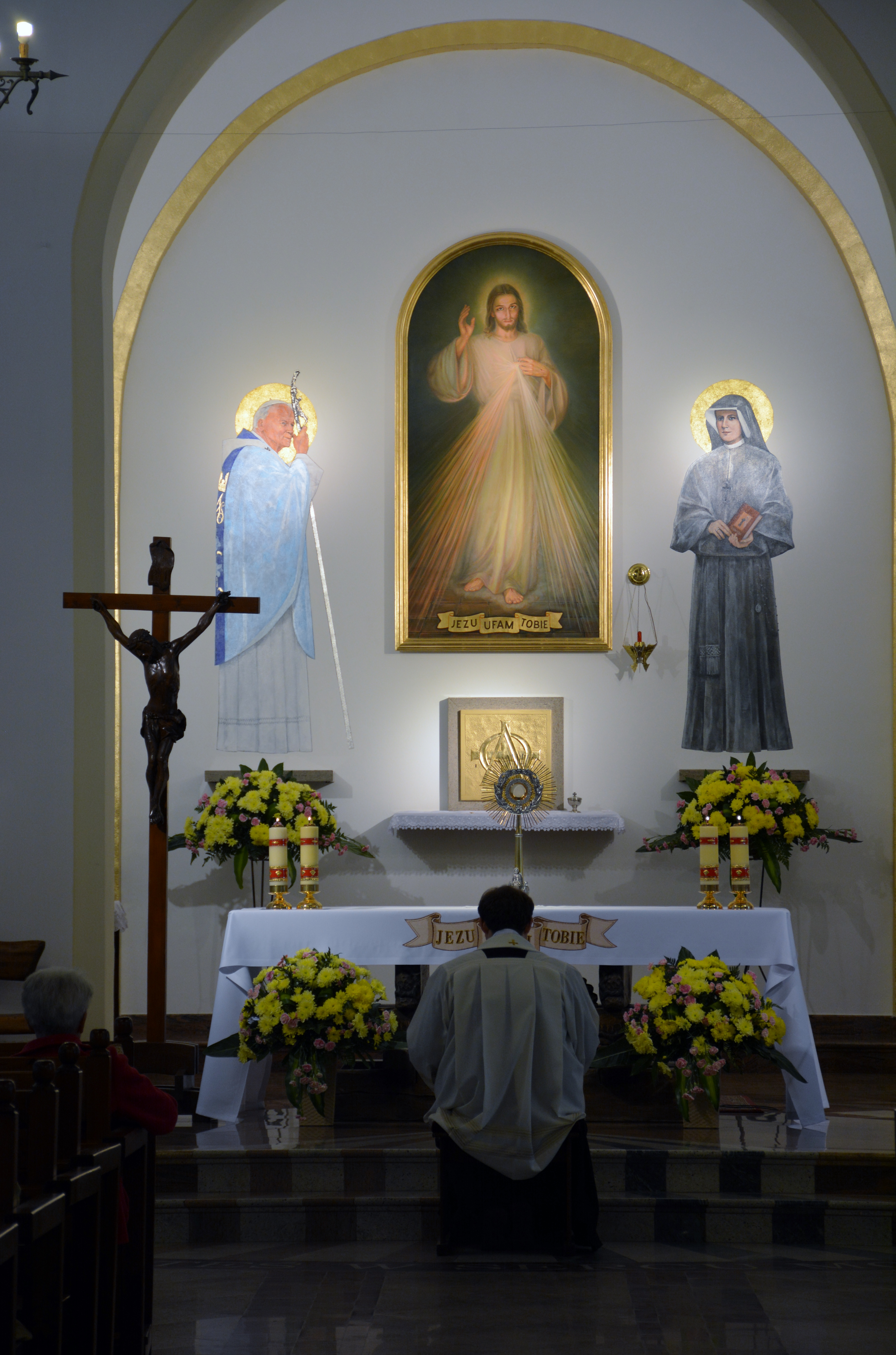
altar, current view

In the late 1970s, Czarnowski and the Wola locals kept up repair efforts on the church and refurbishment of a neighboring run-down building. The work progressed slowly as it was largely a small-scale effort of a handful of people who contributed, "literally with their own hands and resources". Officially, and on advice of the primate, the site was renamed to "Secretariat of the Episcopate of Poland", a measure supposed to discourage an anticipated would-be counter-action on part of the authorities. As space for development was abundant, according to Czarnowski himself he intended to set up sort of a community center, with lecture room, kindergarten and other facilities; his plan was also to link the site to the memory of the Ghetto and the Warsaw Uprising.

In late 1980 the church, still hardly more than an insulated ruin with no interior equipment, became the parochial temple of a newly set up small Church of Divine Mercy, carved out from two older parishes in the neighborhood. According to one source, from the apostolic point of view there was no need to erect a new religious administrative unit. It was reportedly set up as a preemptive measure in the war between the Church and the state; the intention was to thwart demolition of the compound, planned by the authorities and aimed to make room for a new major throughway. The parish was officially set up on December 15, 1980, and Rev. Czarnowski became the first parish priest.

== Icon ==
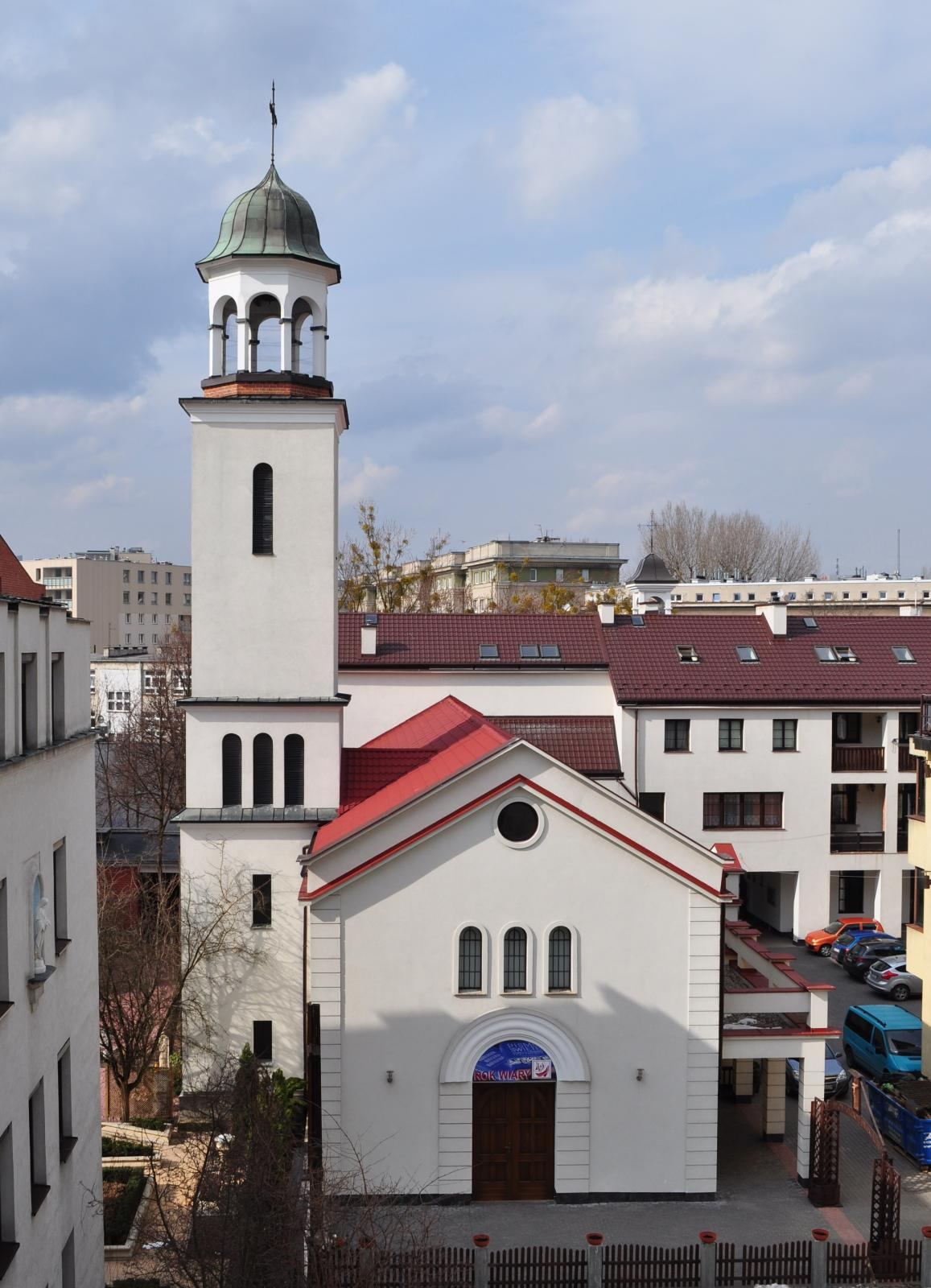
southern wall at present

Following declaration of martial law in late 1981, many artists refused to operate within official dissemination channels, perceived as outposts of totalitarian regime. In search of alternative infrastructure, they increasingly turned towards the Church. In 1983, the art historian and curator Janusz Bogucki and his wife Nina Smolarz focused on the church.With the permission of the parish council and extensive collaboration of Czarnowski they organized a two-week display designed as a multi-media art event. Titled Znak krzyża, or "Sign of the Cross", it explored links between culture and religion. There were 106 painters, sculptors and photographers displaying their works accompanied by theatrical plays, installations, performances, concertos and recitals, often by first-rate Polish artists. Bogucki designed the event in line with Szeemann’s concept of replacing the "white cube" exhibition formula with site-specific setting; the result was extraordinary, as artefacts were displayed in a ruined building site amidst bags of concrete, piles of bricks, loose cables and often construction workers pushing wheelbarrows.

Znak krzyża turned into a groundbreaking art experience, yet it also set the church in the new role. Other art initiatives set in the premises followed, and since the summer of 1983 the site has almost constantly served as an art hub. The place gained a reputation and status as a nationally recognized dissident cultural center. The years of 1983-1985 saw annual Obecność exhibitions, Zaduszki poetyckie and other performances by Akademia Ruchu; seminars like Week of Christian Culture, attended by 44 novelists; avant-garde theatrical plays, often resisting bans or censorship elsewhere, like Raport z Oblężonego Miasta by Teatr Ósmego Dnia; poetic evenings featuring the likes of Jan Twardowski, or poster reviews. In the case of live performances, always held free of charge, conventional seating in the yards is typically filled, overflowing to the ruined walls and nearby trees. The church and neighboring premises were turned into a "full-fledged community center" beyond what Czarnowski could have imagined.

The Good Friday of April 5, 1985 marked a highwater moment for the church in the 1980s: a first-rate theatrical team led by Andrzej Wajda staged Wieczernik by Ernest Bryll. With temperatures slightly above freezing and in the scenery of red-bricked dungeons, densely packed with a standing crowd, the play turned into an electrifying experience that was described as bordering on "mysticism". The drama was staged 15 times during the next few weeks. Thereafter a video-tape recording made rounds across the country and abroad. Another significant milestone was Niebo nowe i ziemia nowa?, the 1985 exhibition by Marek Rostworowski and designed as "reflection upon disintegration of human image". Its impact stemmed from massive scale and a multitude of first-rate artists taking part. The event assumed a somewhat more conservative tone than the earlier avant-garde Bogucki's undertaking, though like Bogucki, Rostworowski was also overwhelmed by the site and its scenery.

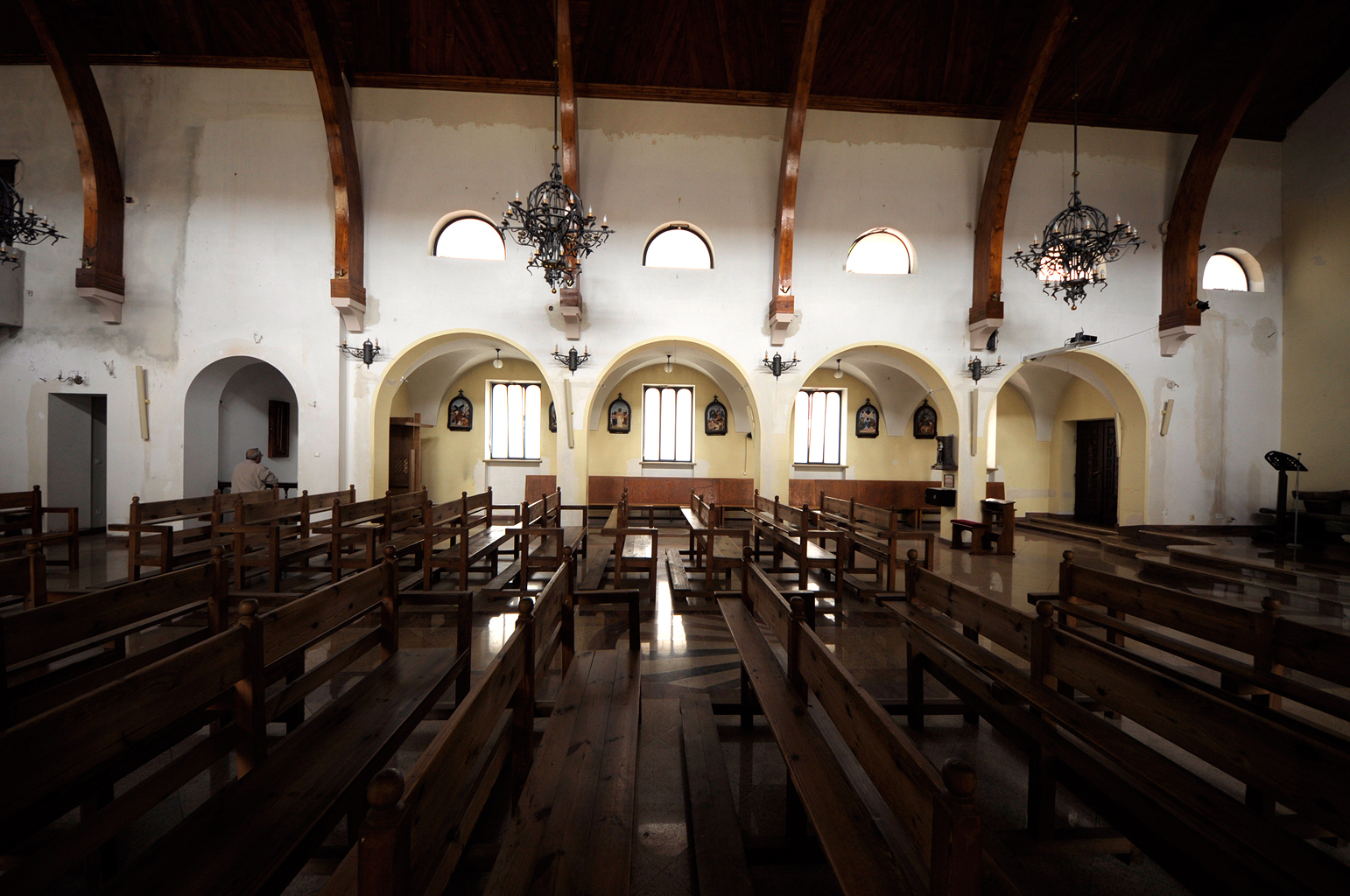
towards western aisle

In the late 1980s, art initiatives started to give way to political undertakings. The former included Dzwonek Niedzielny, a periodical "spoken journal" animated by the Bratkowski couple; Droga świateł, another huge multi-media event by Bogucki, designed as ecumenical experience already hardly fitting with the Catholic framework; an exhibition of works by disciples of Werner Kautsch and his Kassel school, and numerous other events. The latter included a 1987 human rights seminar, organized by the pacifist-green Wolność i Pokój movement and attended by delegates from 16 countries. By the end of the decade, the church premises started to host leaders of semi-clandestine Solidarity; during one of these meetings in late 1988 they set up Komitet Obywatelski przy Lechu Wałęsie, a body which later served as informal executive of political opposition. Komitet kept meeting at Żytnia for months to come and later coordinated also the electoral campaign of 1989. A student religious study group also used to meet regularly in the premises.

== Transition ==
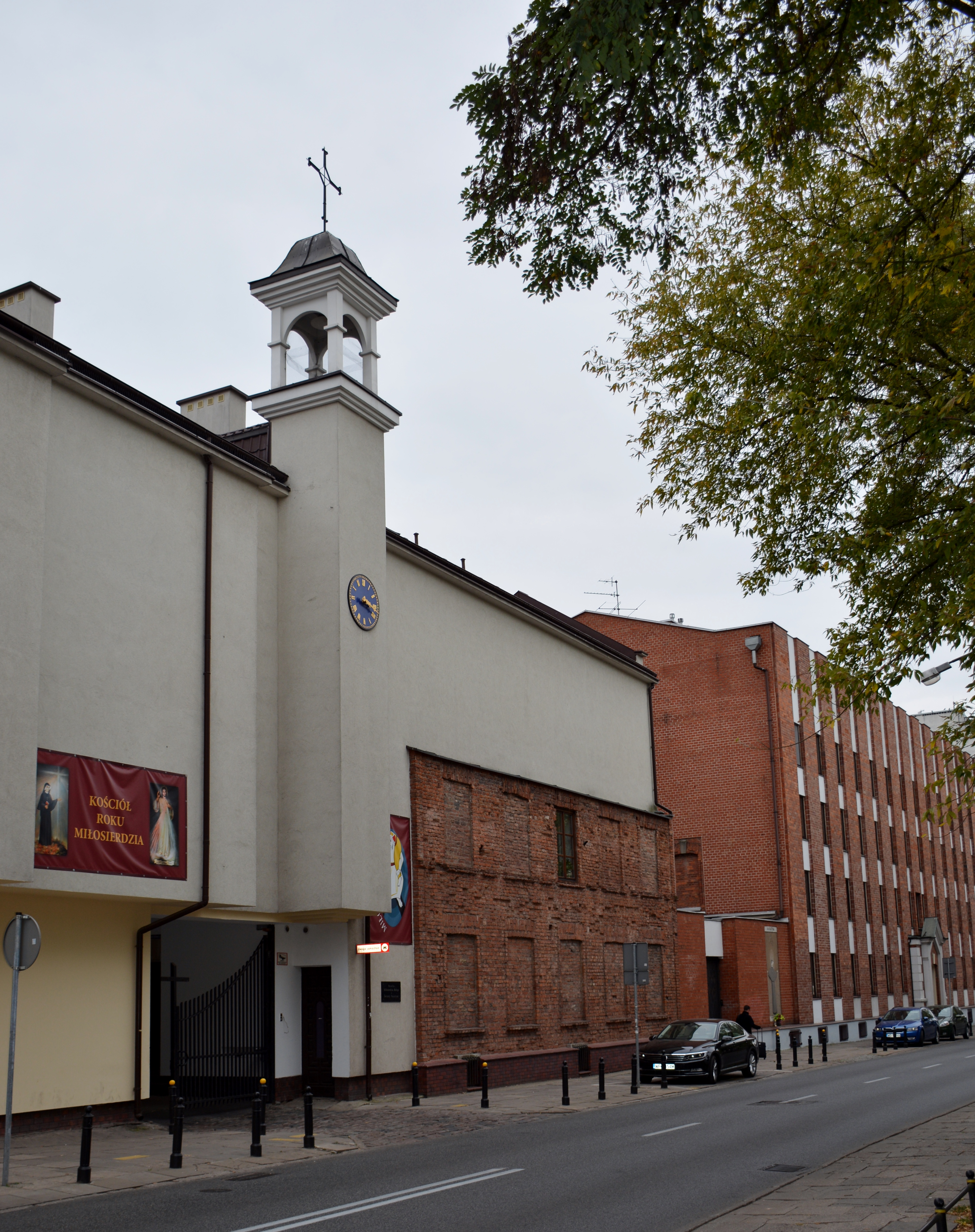
northern wall at present

Political turmoil of 1989 spelled huge change also for the church. Artists and politicians abandoned the parish almost overnight and moved into newly conquered official institutions. The parish priest tried to retain the site's cultural profile by cultivating the ecumenical links. Between 1989 and 1993, the church maintained relations with Buddhists, hosting monks and staging a meeting with Dalai Lama. However, Czarnowski's primary focus was on charity. In 1990, on the nearby corner he opened a canteen for the poor named "ONLY gifts of mercy", which served 800-1000 meals a day. In the roughly refurbished premises of the clergy house, he opened a dormitory and a bath; the premises catered to the homeless, but also to single mothers. Following 20 years of incessant renovation efforts, in the mid-1990s, the church turned from insulated ruin to a crude but usable temple. Major improvements included a primitive roof of acrylic glass, solid windows, wooden floor which covered the basement, and basic interior equipment.

In 1997, Czarnowski was appointed to another religious post; the details of his departure from Żytnia are not clear. He was replaced by a new parish priest, Tadeusz Polak, who in agreement with most of the parishioners soon concluded that the church was badly in need of a decisive overhaul. Major works commenced in the early 21st century, this time carried out by professional construction companies. In course of 5 years, the walls were strengthened with iron reinforcements, the main nave was extended by 10 meters with a new main porch constructed, a new aisle and a side entry were added along the Eastern wall, red-brick walls were plastered, new windows were fitted, and the acrylic roof was replaced with a ceramic one. The renovations were completed when in 2007 the basement was covered with new concrete ceiling and wooden floor gave way to a marble one.

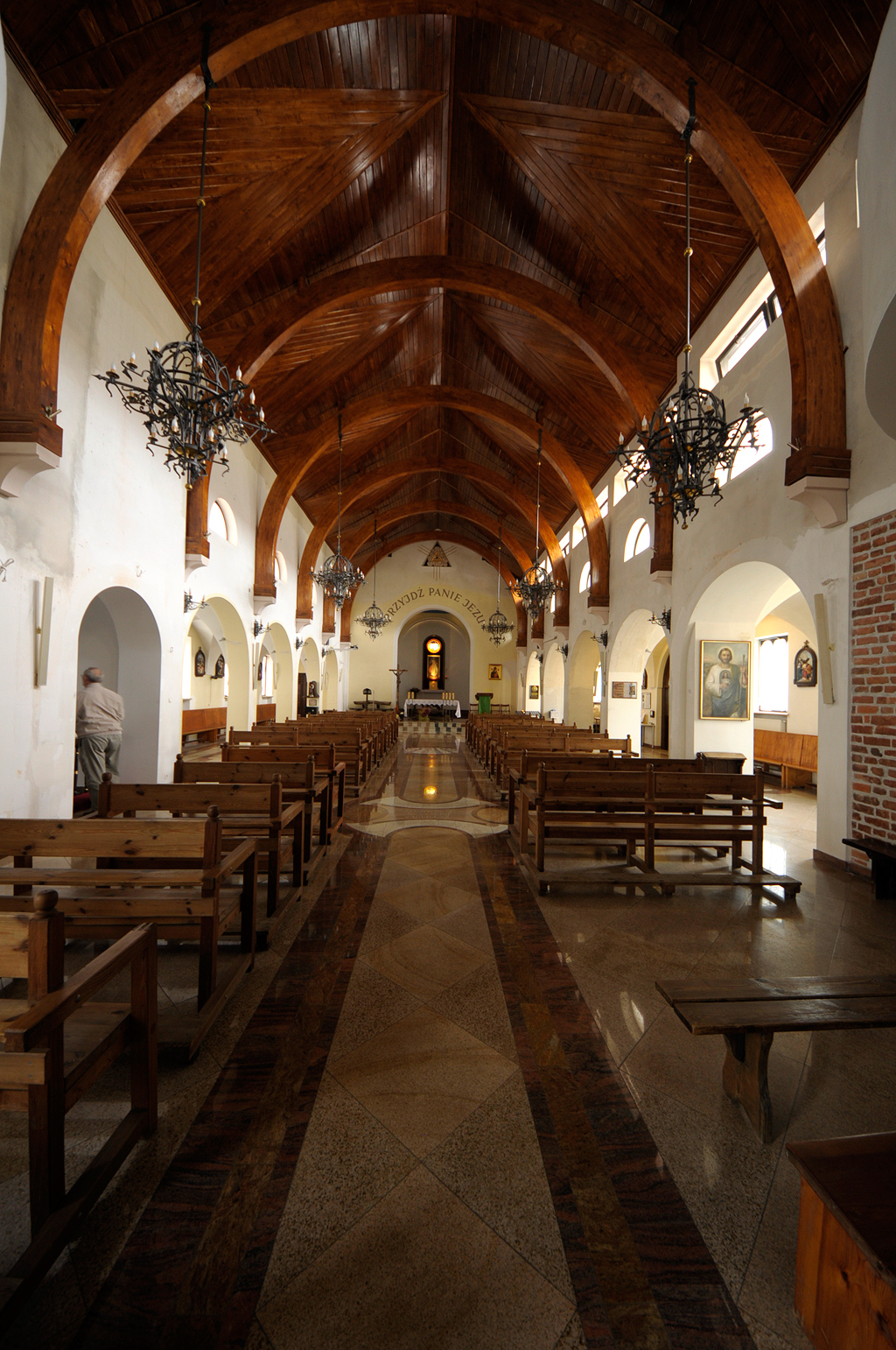
along the main nave

Works launched by Rev. Polak triggered wide controversy. Skeptics claimed that the overhaul would do away with historical memorial, wipe out unique picturesque interior, remove the informal monument to the Warsaw Uprising, and violate conservation laws. Some noted that mass in the crude, bullet-ridden red-brick building with stars shining over the transparent roof made an unforgettable experience; others asserted that the new project envisioned a banal construction with no architectural value. In 2001, the Masovian monument protection office launched the process of registering the church as a law-protected site. The bureaucratic processes stretched into 2003, when construction works were already in full swing. Supporters of the renovation claimed that crumbling bricks were hazard to the public, that the acrylic roof ensured a glasshouse effect in the summer and cracked walls guaranteed sub-zero temperatures in the winter, and other safety concerns. As well, they cited that following the construction of new large residential estates in the area, the small church no longer met the needs of multiplied parish community. Culturally, some felt that the church was monument to Nazi barbarity and Communist malice rather than to the Warsaw Uprising.

The conflict was defined along different lines, clearly marked by emerging animosity between increasingly secular and progressive socio-economic elites, and an increasingly traditionalist Church. Supporters of the renovation suspected that the Warsaw intellectual and art pundits intended to keep the church as a monument to their own activity of the 1980s. Opponents maintained that the Polish Roman-Catholic Church was plagued by narrow-mindedness, glitzy esthetics and temptation to show off wealth. Some concluded that ecclesiastic decision-makers wanted no competition to the cult of St. Faustina, especially if the church was to be elevated to the status of her shrine. A few noted that in Poland, following the period of "Church-sponsored art", the religious and the artists parted and found themselves largely on a collision course.

== Present day ==
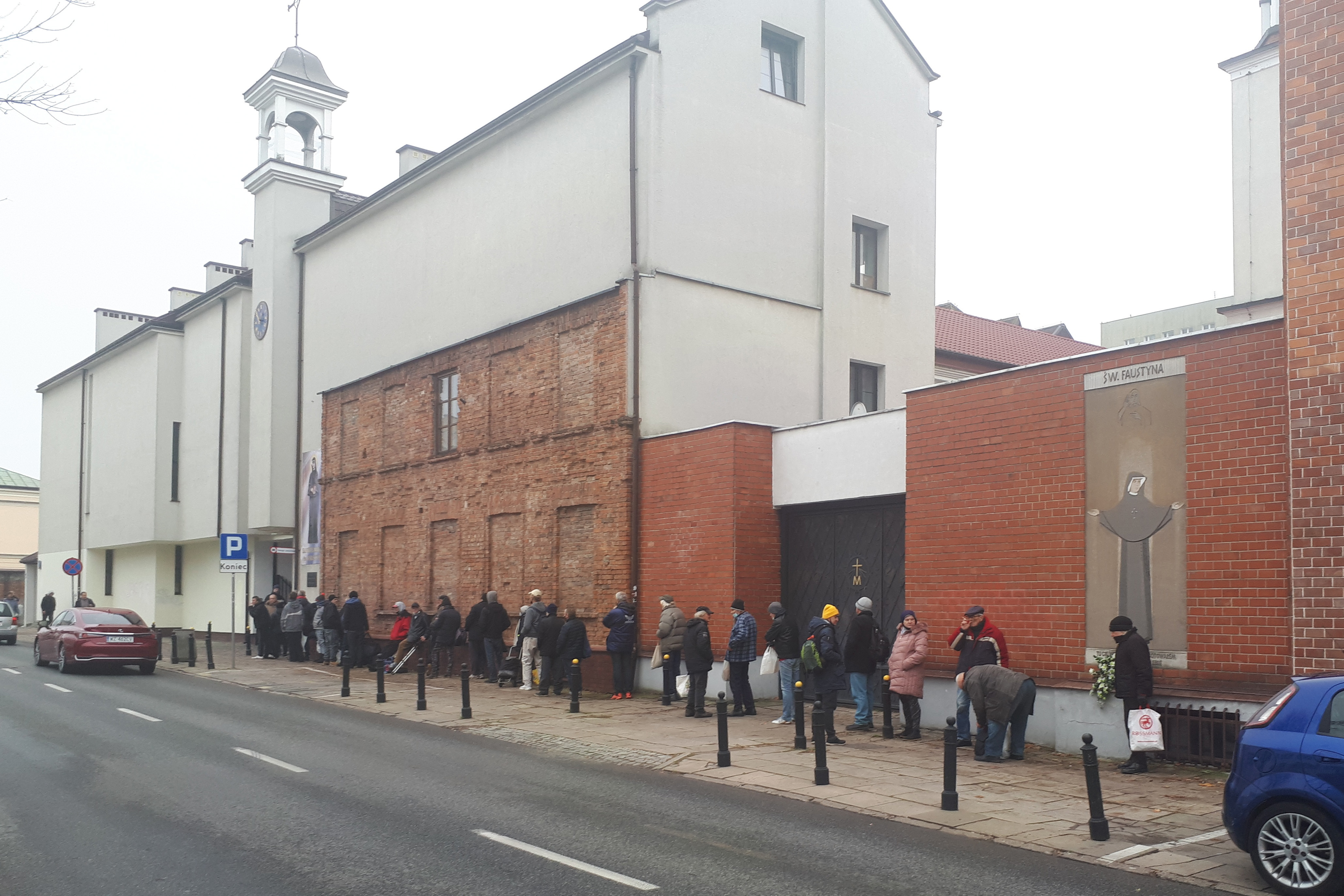
Zytnia, que to charity meal, 2021

Rev. Polak launched two specific initiatives which stand out as a peculiarity of the Divine Mercy and St. Faustina parish: one is the 24/7 perpetual Eucharistic adoration, practiced since the burglary suffered in 2000, and a popular feast Żytnią do nieba, organized early September since 2005. Polak was reassigned to another post in 2011; none of the sources consulted provide any information on motives of his departure. He was replaced as the parish priest by Rev. Krzysztof Stosur, who for some time added final touches to the new church interior. He continued most of the parochial activities developed by his predecessors and common to most Roman-Catholic parishes in Poland, like Rosary Circle or youth altar service. Charity work is continuing, though with some change. The canteen at the corner of Leszno and Okopowa has been closed and most services performed in the premises have been formally transferred to Caritas, the religious charity organization; however, queues of the homeless and destitute city dwellers are still trademark of the church neighborhood.

Zytnia parish priests
name	term
Wojciech Czarnowski	1980–1997
Tadeusz Polak	1997–2011
Krzysztof Stosur	2011-onwards

Stosur launched new initiatives, e.g. a Prayer Support Group, a currently defunct youth football team, dedicated film screenings in Warsaw cinemas, discount schemes offered by a friendly theater or bus tours following nationwide religious tourist trails. During Stosur's tenure the church continues hosting cultural events, though they do not resemble massive and nationally known episodes of the 1980s. Periodically the site does host theatrical plays, concertos, recitals, film screenings, lectures or poetry sessions organized. A new initiative is a mass said to honor the insurgents of the Warsaw Uprising, organized on the anniversary of the August 2, 1944 service for the Parasol Battalion. Attendants for this service include a group of reenactors in complete military gear. Afterwards the parishioners and guests are walked past major 1944 combat sites in the area.

key dates in church history
date	description
November 1, 1862	chapel consecrated
August 1, 1925	Helena Kowalska admitted to the convent
August 9, 1944	church seized and burnt by the Germans
April 20, 1973	first post-war mass said
December 15, 1980	becomes parish church
April 5, 1985	Wieczernik staged first time
December 18, 1988	Komitet Obywatelski set up
April 23, 2017	elevated to shrine

On April 23, 2017, the church was elevated to the status of a shrine (sanktuarium). This was motivated by its relation to St. Faustina; the church was renamed to "church of Divine Mercy and St. Faustina" accordingly. In practical terms, the change included the church on the list of targets of religious tourism, fairly popular in Poland, and reinforced already growing stream of pilgrims pursuing the itinerary of St. Faustina. The building itself is no longer subject to construction projects. Its architecture is described as somewhat modeled on early Christian temples, with an interior shaped by vaults and arches. The shrine is now home to 6 religious practitioners, apart from the parish priest also 3 vicars and 2 residents. They maintain a parish web page, a Facebook account and issue a weekly bulletin Miłosierdzie. Despite the shrine status and controversy over religious influence on the site, the area remains more secular than average. Overall religiosity level in the parish is far below the Polish and significantly below the Warsaw standards; while the country average for dominicantes is at 45% and the Warsaw figure is 27%, at Żytnia it stands at mere 16%.

== See also ==
- Faustina Kowalska
- Divine Mercy and St. Faustina parish (in Polish)
