= Divine Mercy Church, Kalisz =

Divine Mercy Church
- Kościół Miłosierdzia Bożego w Kaliszu
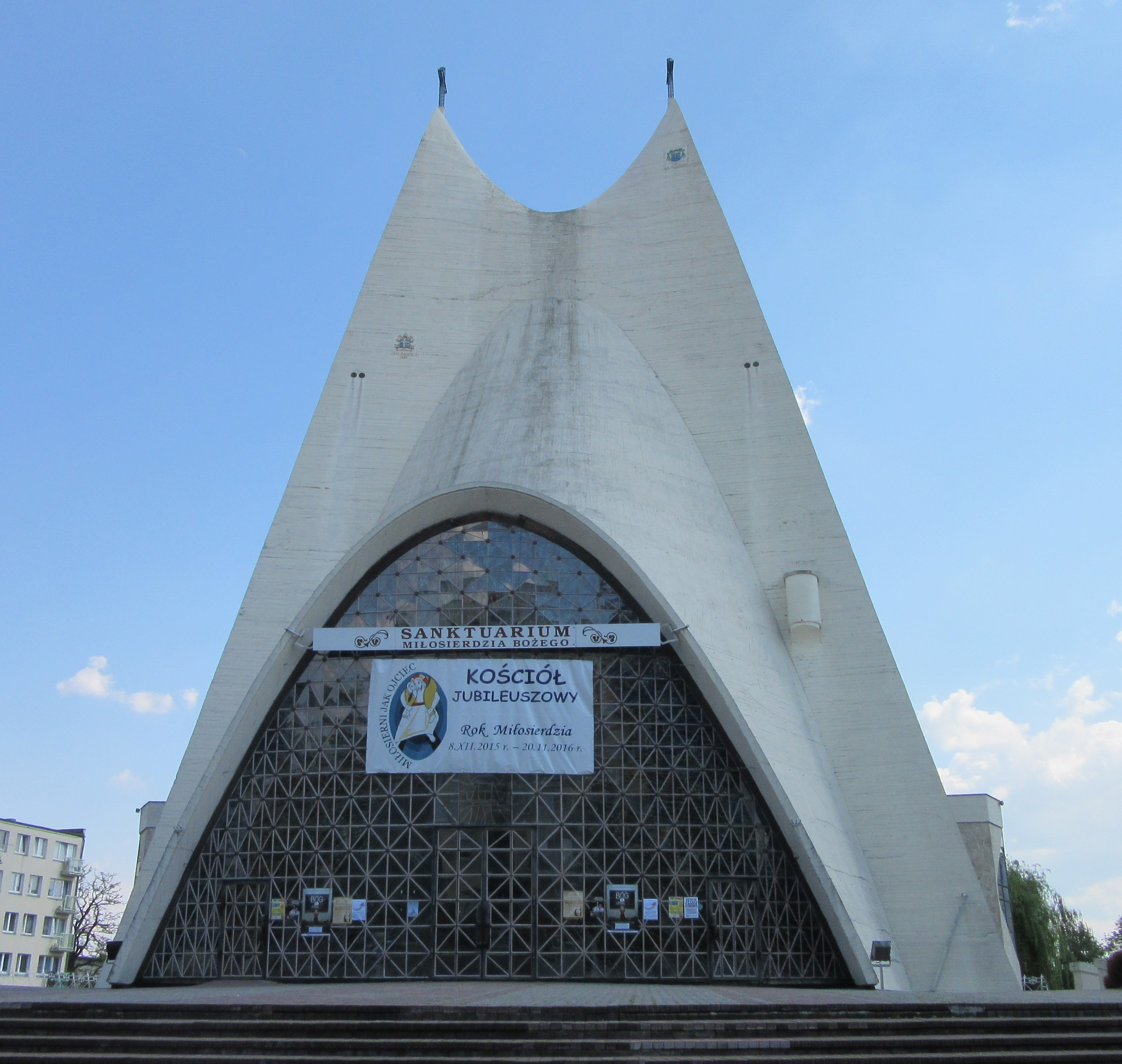
- Front view of the church
- Divine Mercy Church
- 51°44′55.5″N 18°04′42.8″E
- Location: 54–56 Asnyka Street, Kalisz
- Country: Poland
- Denomination: Roman Catholic
- Sui iuris church: Latin Church
- Website: www.milosierdzieboze.kalisz.pl

History
- Status: Parish church and diocesan sanctuary
- Dedication: Divine Mercy

Architecture
- Functional status: Active
- Heritage designation: Register of monuments
- Architect(s): Jerzy Kuźmienko; Andrzej Fajans; Structural design: Wacław Zalewski and collaborators
- Architectural type: Church
- Style: Modernist
- Years built: 1977–1993
- Groundbreaking: 25 September 1977

Specifications
- Height: 45 m (148 ft)
- Materials: Reinforced concrete

Administration
- Diocese: Diocese of Kalisz
- Deanery: Kalisz II
- Parish: Divine Mercy

Divine Mercy Church (Polish: Kościół Miłosierdzia Bożego w Kaliszu), formally the Diocesan Sanctuary of Divine Mercy, is a Roman Catholic parish church and diocesan sanctuary in Kalisz, Poland. It belongs to the Kalisz II Deanery of the Diocese of Kalisz.

The church was designed in 1958 by Jerzy Kuźmienko and Andrzej Fajans following an architectural competition organised by the Poznań branch of the Association of Polish Architects. Construction took place between 1977 and 1993. The building is distinguished by a large, continuously formed reinforced-concrete shell composed principally of hyperbolic paraboloid surfaces and spanning the interior without columns or other intermediate supports.

== History ==
The Parish of Divine Mercy was established in September 1952. Before a permanent church was constructed, parishioners attended services in the convent chapel of the Sisters of Common Work of the Immaculate Conception of Mary. Permission to build a church was granted in 1957 but was subsequently withdrawn by the provincial authorities in Poznań.

In 1958, the Poznań branch of the Association of Polish Architects organised a competition for the proposed parish church. The entry prepared by Jerzy Kuźmienko in cooperation with Andrzej Fajans, who was then still an architecture student, received first prize and was selected for construction. The design appeared shortly after the official rejection of Socialist realism in Polish architecture and made extensive use of the structural and formal possibilities of reinforced concrete. Architectural historian Maciej Czarnecki has attributed the failure to proceed with construction at that time partly to the political restrictions imposed on church building in communist Poland, where a monumental new church could be interpreted as a public political statement.

A new building permit was obtained in 1974. Some changes were made to the original design before construction commenced. On 25 September 1977, Bishop Jan Zaręba of Włocławek blessed and laid the foundation stone.

Much of the work was carried out by parishioners rather than by a large specialist contractor. Concrete was mixed on site and transported in wheelbarrows, while local craftsmen produced the joinery and metalwork. The work was supervised by Fajans, and the principal architectural ideas of the 1958 proposal were retained despite alterations made during the prolonged construction process.

The lower level was blessed by Bishop Zaręba on 18 December 1983 and thereafter used for worship. The upper church was consecrated on 26 September 1993 by Stanisław Napierała, the first bishop of Kalisz, who also designated it as the Diocesan Sanctuary of Divine Mercy.

== Architecture and structure ==
Divine Mercy Church is an example of the expressive and technologically experimental strand of Polish post-war modernism that developed after the end of Socialist realism. Although the building was completed during the period in which postmodernism had become influential in Poland, its principal form derives from the original 1958 modernist design.

Kuźmienko's concept was based on an interest in mathematically generated spatial structures. During the development of the project, the geometry of the roof was investigated at the BISTYP industrial design office under the direction of structural engineer Wacław Zalewski. The design team used physical models, including a model made from strings fixed to curved acrylic frames, to establish the ruled surfaces of the shell. A later plastic model fitted with strain gauges was tested in a wind tunnel to examine the effects of asymmetrical loading.

The wider design and engineering team included architect Piotr Sembrat and specialists in mathematics and structural engineering. Zalewski's office was responsible for the final mathematical and structural development of the roof.

The complex exterior is principally composed of three large hyperbolic paraboloids forming the tower, the main body of the church and the front section. Three smaller paraboloid surfaces form lunettes at the rear of the building. The nave, towers and apse are joined within a continuously shaped reinforced-concrete envelope rather than being expressed as separate structural elements.

The shell over the nave covers approximately 1,000 m^{2} (11,000 sq ft) and rises to a maximum height of 45 m (148 ft). Its thickness varies from approximately 14 cm (5.5 in) to only 6 cm (2.4 in) at the centre of the principal arch. The interior requires no columns or intermediate supports beneath the shell. Czarnecki has described it as the first and only Polish building of this scale to employ a single continuous shell of this type.

The building's thin-shell geometry has been discussed in relation to international experiments in reinforced-concrete construction, including the work of Félix Candela, Pier Luigi Nervi, Oscar Niemeyer, Eduardo Torroja, and Kenzo Tange.

== Interior ==
The principal visual element of the presbytery is a mosaic figure of Christ approximately 9 m (30 ft) high. The altar composition was executed by Włodzimierz Ćwir, Wojciech Sałata and Elżbieta Szwarc-Jarosik. Ćwir also designed the church's stained-glass windows.

A large glazed portal in the front elevation creates a visual axis through the entrance towards the high altar. The remaining interior surfaces are comparatively restrained, allowing the form of the concrete shell and the altar composition to dominate the space.

== Heritage protection and documentation ==
Divine Mercy Church was entered in the register of monuments of the Greater Poland Voivodeship on 30 June 2023 under registration number 1166/Wlkp/A. Because construction had been completed only thirty years earlier, it was among the youngest buildings in the region to receive statutory monument protection.

Concerns about the technical condition of the complex concrete shell led to a detailed digital survey undertaken for conservation and maintenance planning. A peer-reviewed study published in 2025 documented the building using terrestrial laser scanning, drone and ground-based photogrammetry, tachymetric measurements and manual verification.

The survey used 455 scanning positions and 6,460 photographs to create point clouds, orthophotographs, two-dimensional documentation and a parametric three-dimensional model. Researchers found measurable differences between the ideal mathematical geometry and the structure as built, reflecting the manual construction methods used during the project. The resulting documentation was intended to assist structural analysis, long-term condition monitoring and the development of a preliminary heritage building information modelling model.

== Gallery ==
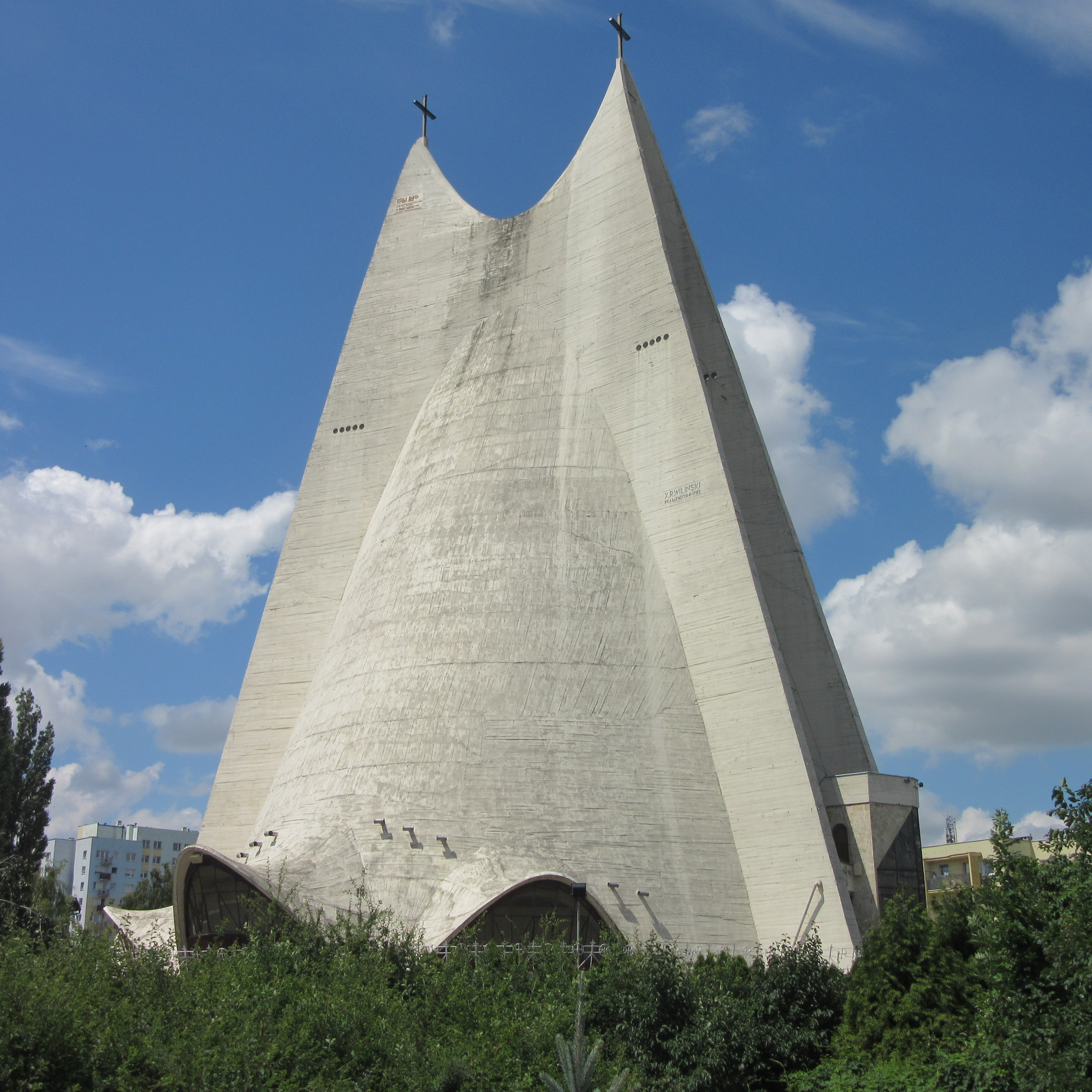
Exterior view

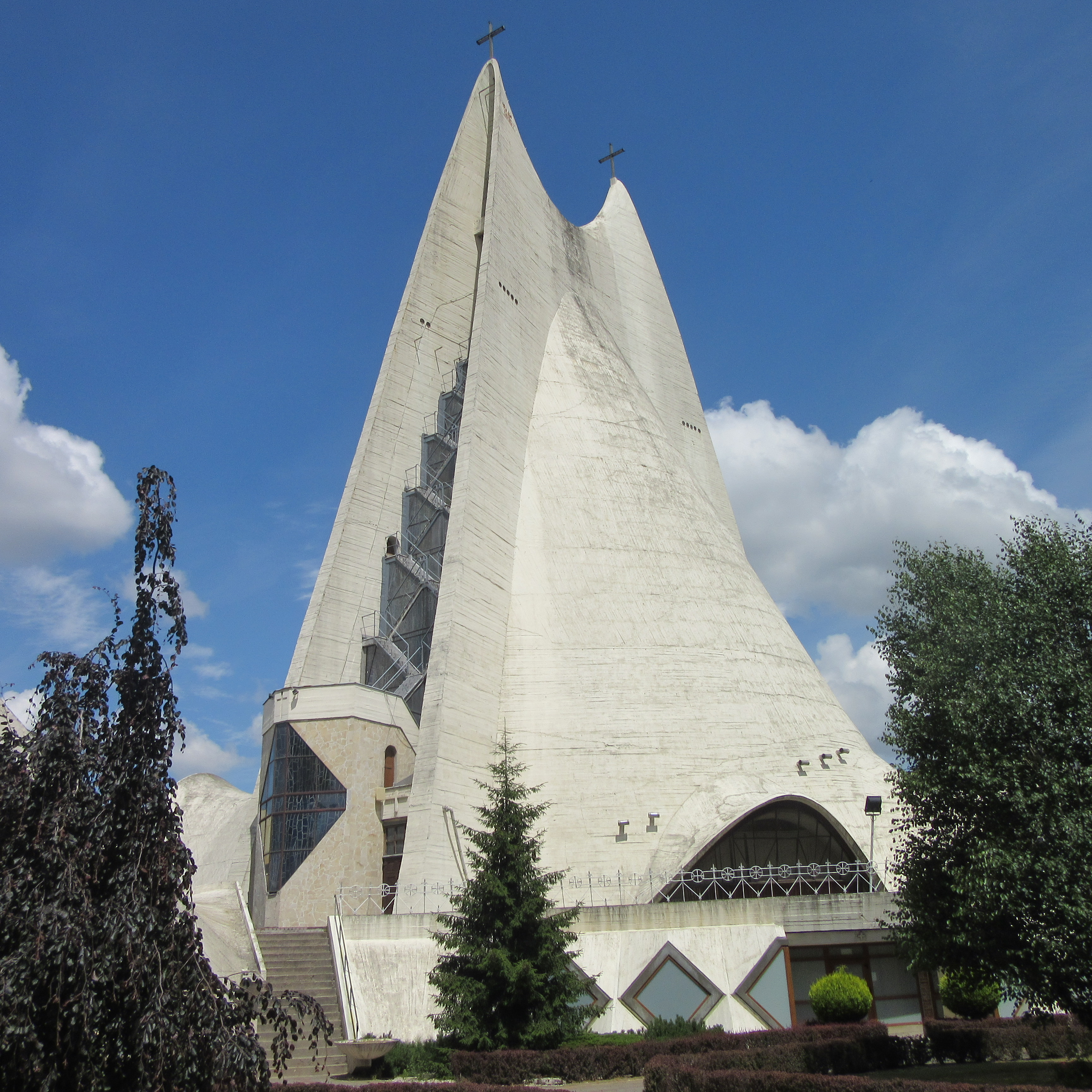
Exterior view

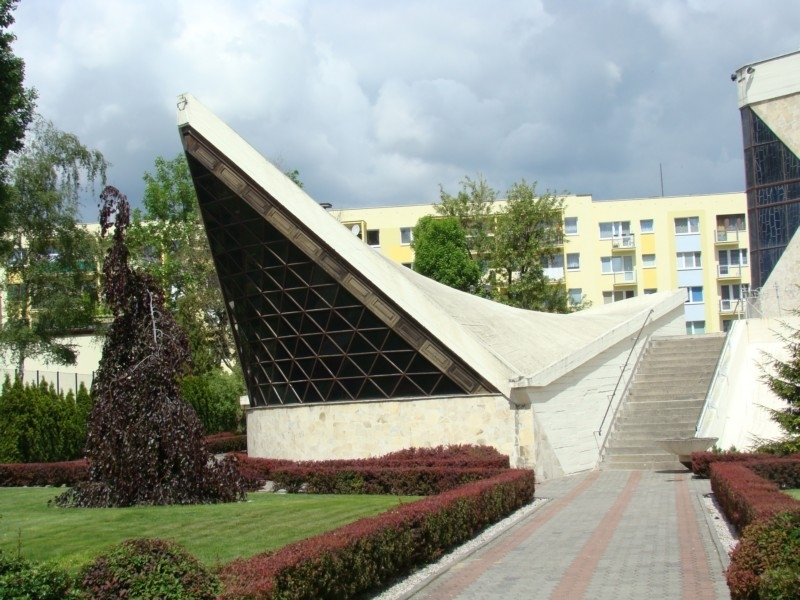
Structure in front of the entrance

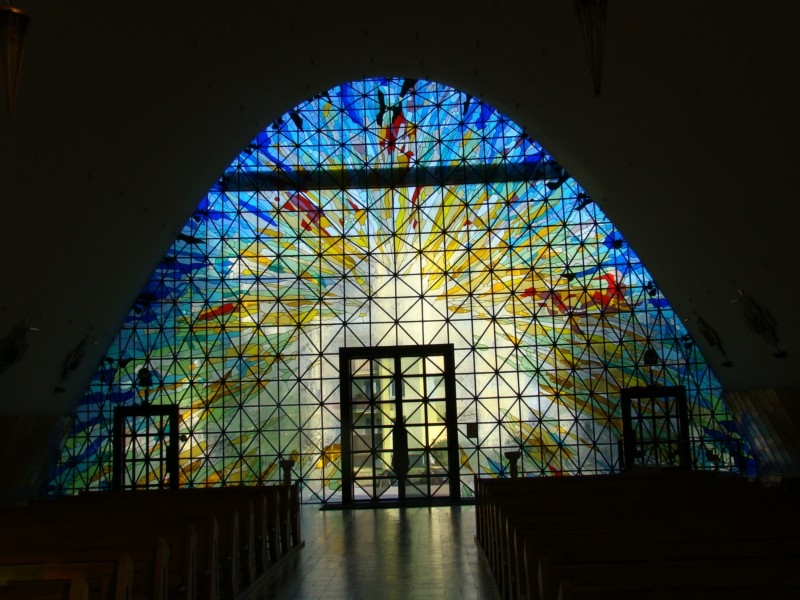
Stained-glass window in the front elevation

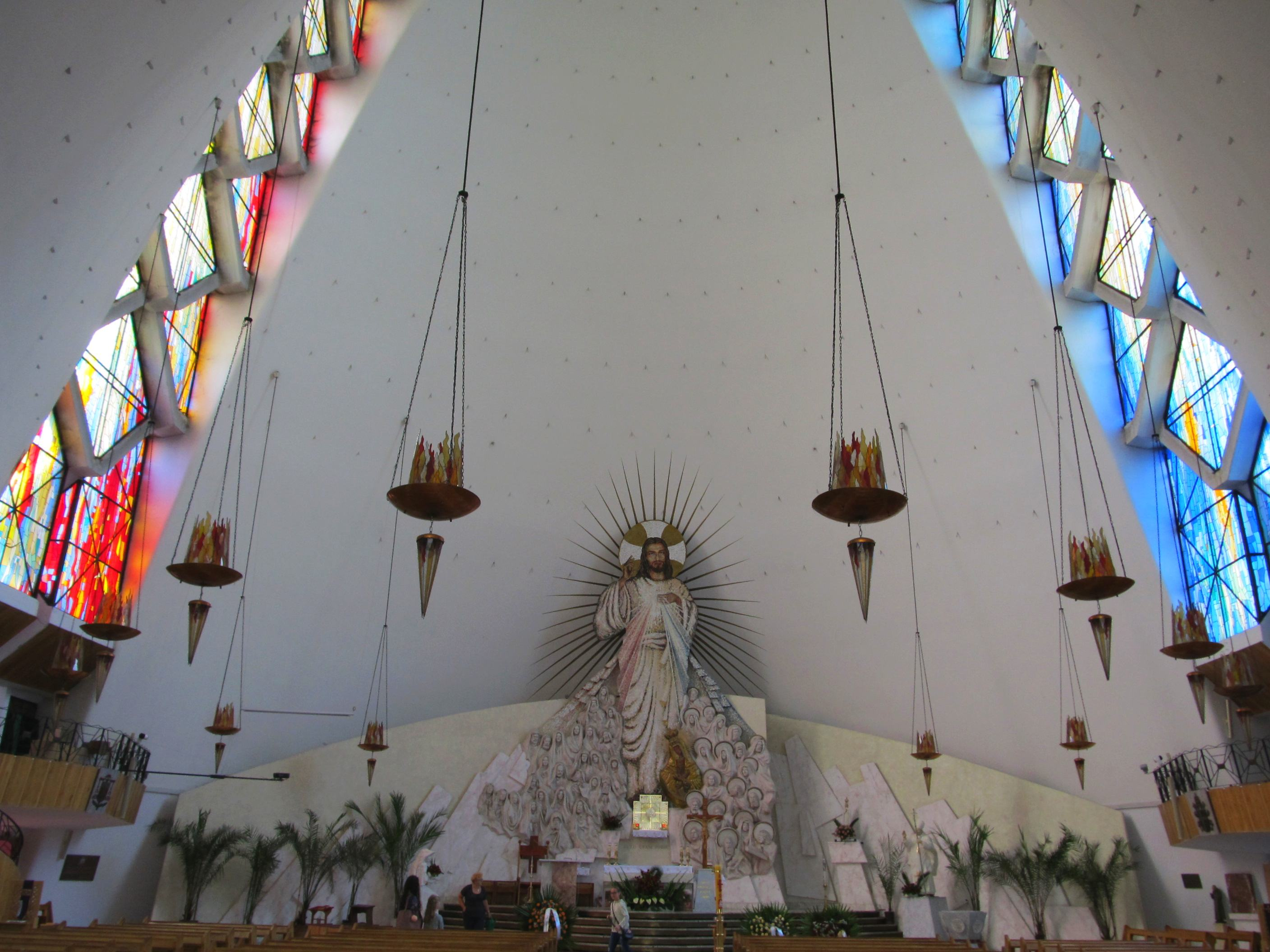
Presbytery

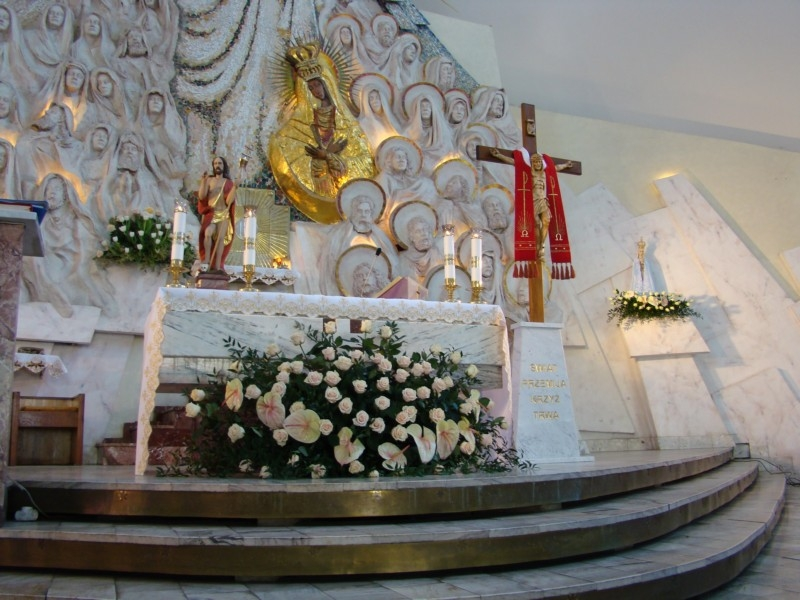
High altar

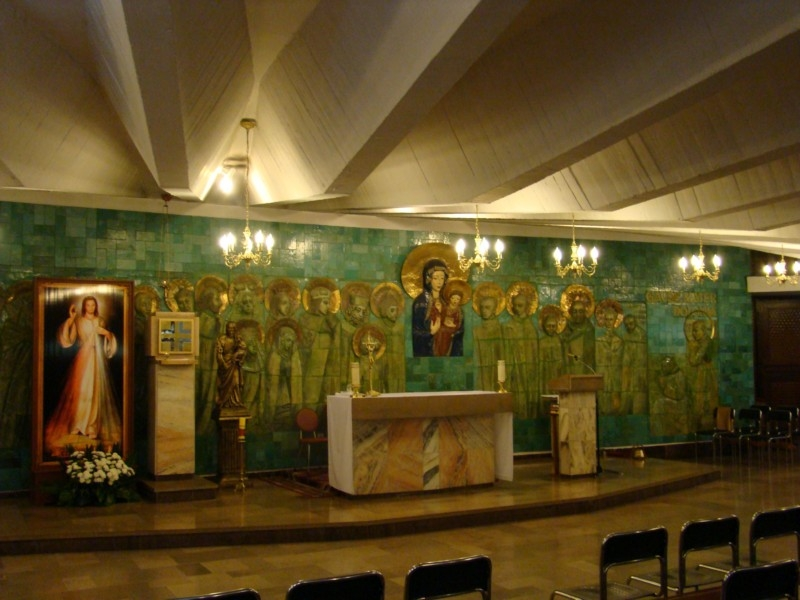
Altar

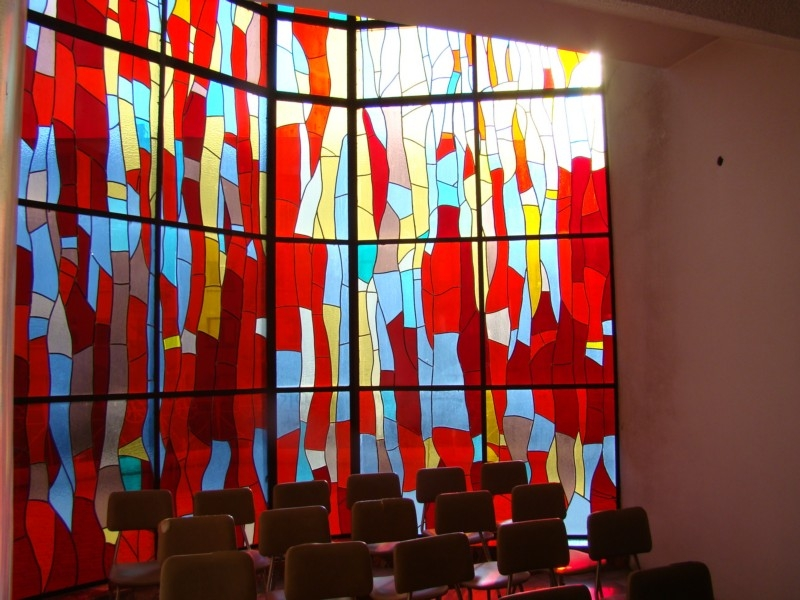
Stained-glass window
