= List of books about cannabis =

This is a chronological list of notable books written about cannabis. Both fictional and non-fictional books are included.

== Fiction ==
- It's Just a Plant (2005) by Ricardo Cortés
- Legal High (2016) by Rainer Schmidt
- Mr Nice (1996) by Howard Marks
- Reefer Punks and Spooks: Collected Works of Roy Berger (2024)

== Non-fiction ==
- The Hasheesh Eater (1857) by Fitz Hugh Ludlow
- Les Paradis artificiels (1860) by Charles Baudelaire
- The Alice B. Toklas Cook Book (1954) by Alice B. Toklas
- Marihuana en Hasjiesj (1969) by Martin Schouten
- Marihuana Reconsidered (1971) by Lester Grinspoon
- Licit and Illicit Drugs (1972) by Edward M. Brecher
- Marihuana: a Signal of Misunderstanding (1972) by the Shafer Commission (also The Shafer Report)
- Reefer Madness: The History of Marijuana in America (1979) by Larry Sloman
- Marihuana: The First Twelve Thousand Years (1980) by Ernest Lawrence Abel
- The Emperor Wears No Clothes (1985) by Jack Herer
- Drug Warriors and Their Prey: From Police Power to Police State (1996) by Richard Miller
- Mr Nice (1996) by Howard Marks
- Smoke and Mirrors: The War on Drugs and the Politics of Failure (1996) by Dan Baum
- Marijuana Myths, Marijuana Facts: A Review of the Scientific Evidence (1997) by Lynn Zimmer and John P. Morgan
- Romancing Mary Jane (1998) by Michael Poole
- The Botany of Desire (2001) by Michael Pollan
- Pot Planet (2002) by Brian Preston
- Reefer Madness: Sex, Drugs, and Cheap Labor in the American Black Market (2003) by Eric Schlosser
- Cannabis: A History (2003) by Martin Booth
- This Is Your Country On Drugs (2009) by Ryan Grim
- The Pot Book (2010) by Julie Holland
- Growgirl (2012) by Heather Donahue
- The Official High Times Cannabis Cookbook (2012) by Elise McDonough
- Too High to Fail (2012) by Doug Fine
- Thai Stick (2013) by Peter H. Maguire
- Humboldt: Life on America's Marijuana Frontier (2013) by Emily Brady
- A New Leaf (2014) by Alyson Martin and Nushin Rashidian
- Hemp Bound (2014) by Doug Fine
- Hidden Harvest (2014) by Mark Coakley
- Marijuana Nation (2014) by Roger Roffman
- Weed Land (2014) by Peter Hecht
- Weed the People (2015) by Bruce Barcott
- Herb: Mastering the Art of Cooking with Cannabis (2015) by Laurie Wolf and Melissa Parks
- Brave New Weed (2016) by Joe Dolce
- Weed: The User's Guide (2016) by David Schmader
- Marijuana Killed My Cancer and Is Keeping Me Cancer-Free (2016) by Erika Karohs
- Cooking With Herb (2017) by Cedella Marley and Raquel Pelzel
- Grass Roots (2017) by Emily Dufton
- Cannabis and Cancer: Assessing the Science Base (2017) by National Academies of Sciences, Engineering, and Medicine
- Bong Appétit: Mastering the Art of Cooking with Weed (2018) by Elise McDonough, Marcus Nilsson, and Ho-Mui Wong
- Craft Weed (2018) by Ryan Stoa
- How to Change Your Mind (2018) by Michael Pollan
- The Little Book of Cannabis (2018) by Amanda Siebert
- Cannabis: The Illegalization of Weed in America (2019) by Box Brown
- Higher Etiquette (2019) by Lizzie Post
- Pot in Pans (2019) by Robyn Griggs Lawrence
- Tell Your Children: The Truth About Marijuana, Mental Illness and Violence (2019) by Alex Berenson
- American Hemp Farmer (2020) by Doug Fine
- Commodifying Cannabis (2020) by Bradley J. Borougerdi
- The Art of Cooking with Cannabis: CBD and THC-Infused Recipes from Across America (2021) by Tracey Medeiros
- Drug Use for Grown-Ups (2021) by Carl Hart
- Weed Rules (2023) by Jay Wexler
- The Science of Weed (2024) by Godfrey Pearlson

== See also ==
- Cannabis cookbook
- List of cannabis columns
