= Recreational drug use =

Use of drugs with the primary intention to alter the state of consciousness

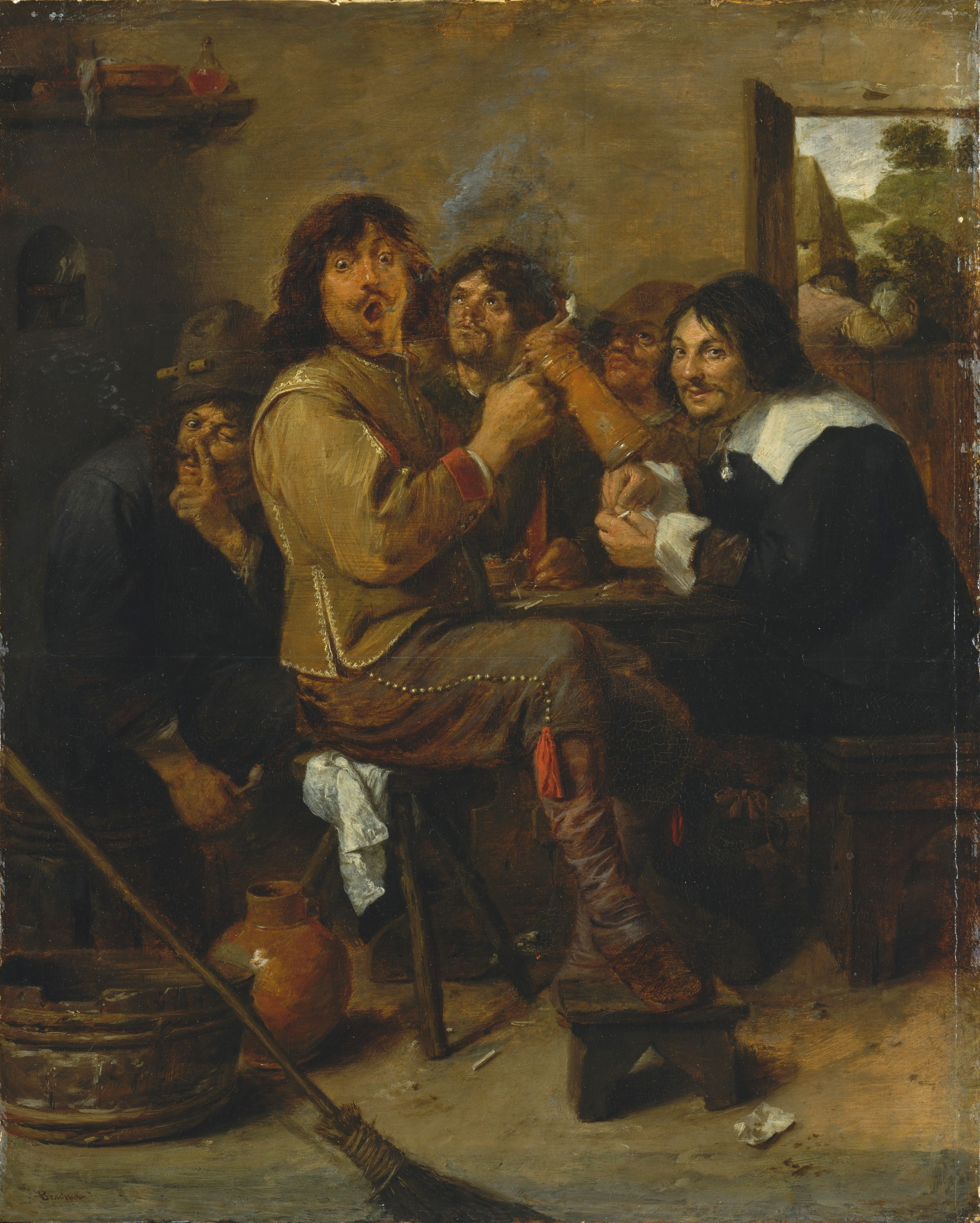
The Smokers, a 1636 portrait by Adriaen Brouwer

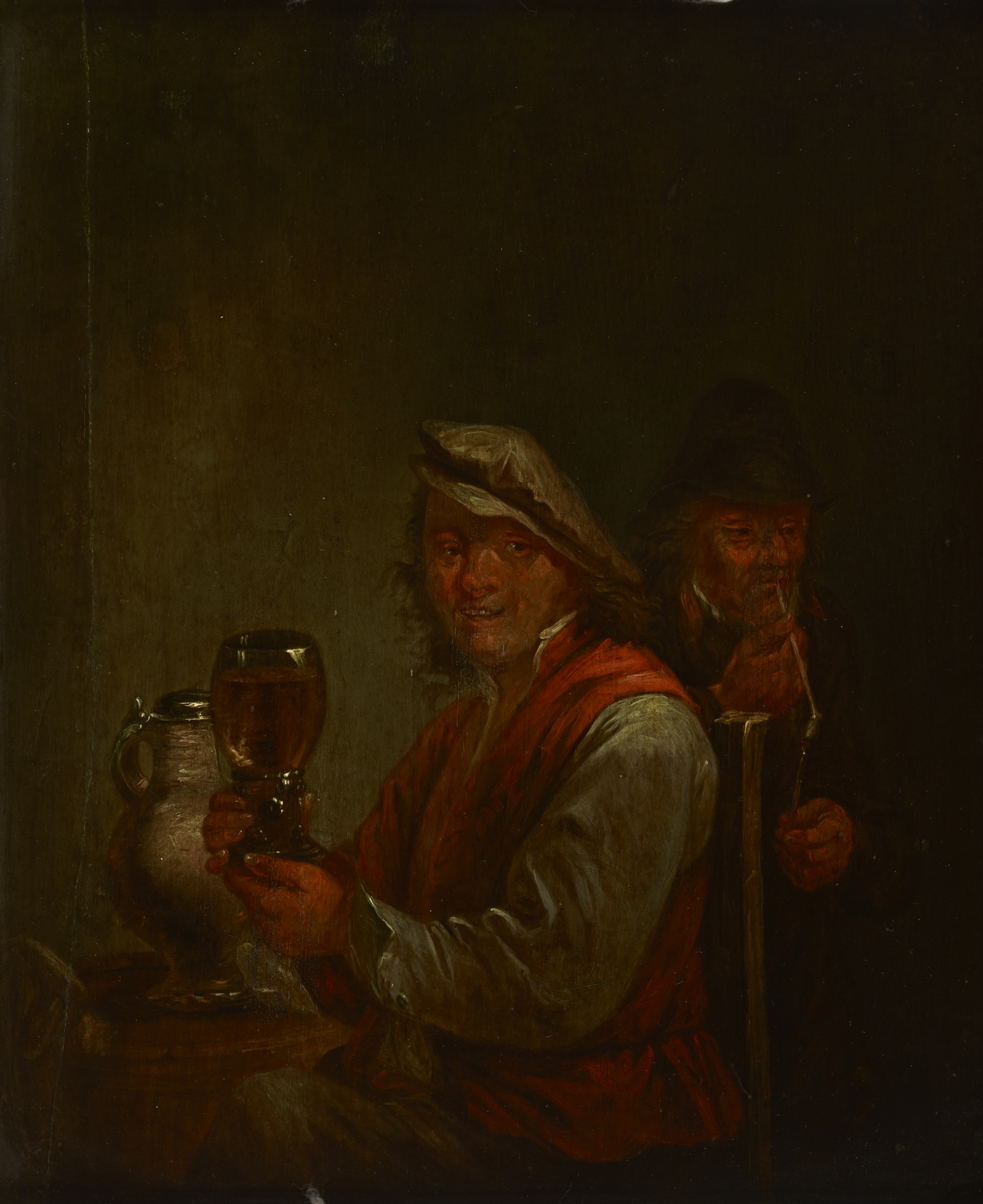
Drinking Man and an Old Smoking Man, an 18th-century portrait by anonymous author

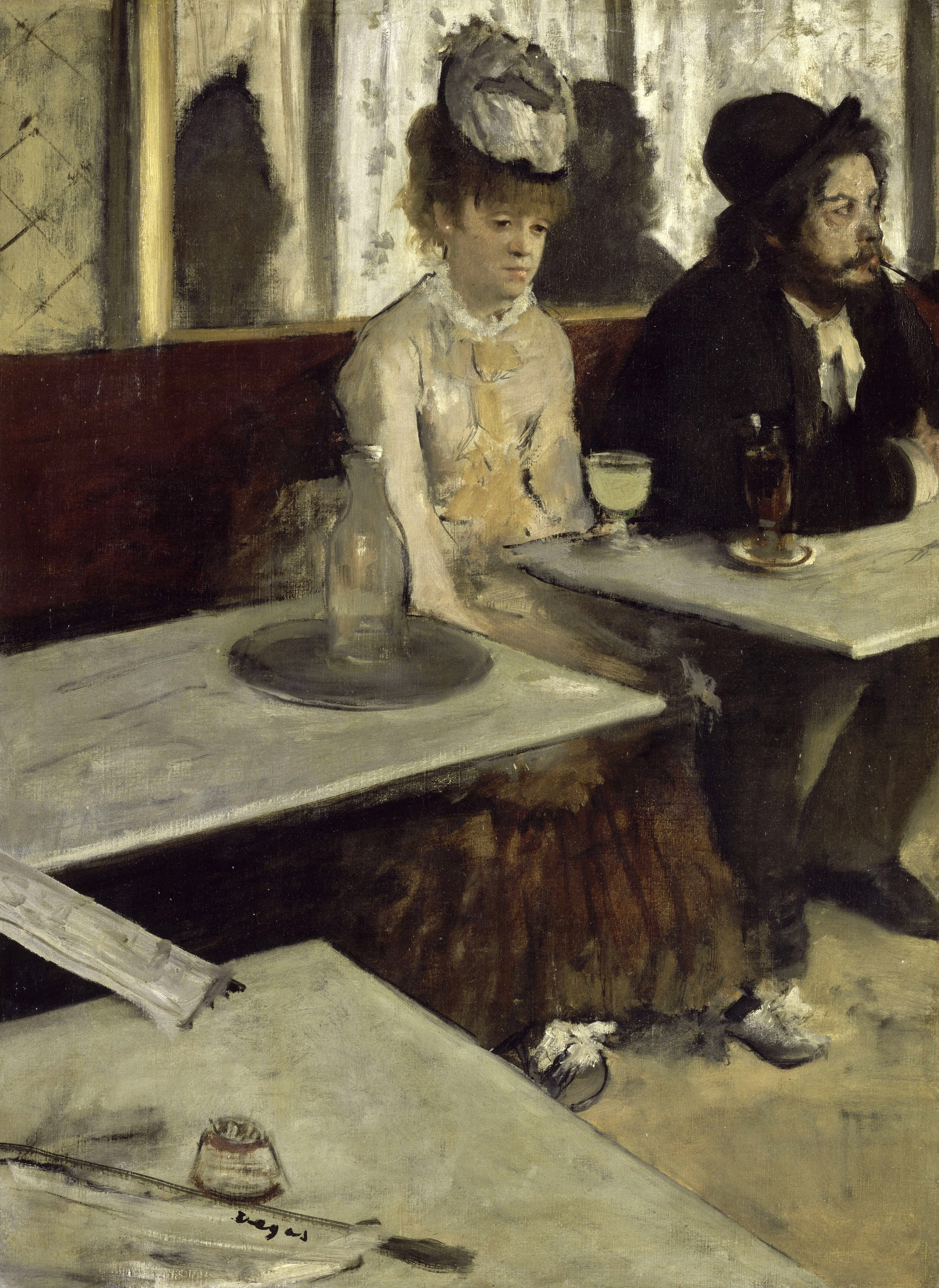
L'Absinthe, an 1876 portrait by Edgar Degas

Recreational drug use is the use of one or more psychoactive drugs to induce an altered state of consciousness, either for pleasure or for some other casual purpose or pastime. When a psychoactive drug enters the user's body, it induces an intoxicating effect. Recreational drugs are commonly divided into three categories: depressants (drugs that slow down the central nervous system), stimulants (drugs that speed up the central nervous system), and hallucinogens (drugs that induce perceptual distortions).

In popular practice, recreational drug use is generally tolerated as a social behaviour, rather than perceived as the medical condition of self-medication. However, drug use and drug addiction are severely stigmatized everywhere in the world. Many people also use prescribed and controlled depressants such as opioids, opiates, and benzodiazepines. What controlled substances are considered generally unlawful to possess varies by country, but usually includes cannabis (though some areas have legalised cannabis use), cocaine, opioids, MDMA, amphetamine, methamphetamine, psychedelics, benzodiazepines, and barbiturates. As of 2015, it is estimated that about 5% of people worldwide aged 15 to 65 (158 million to 351 million) had used controlled drugs at least once.

Common recreational drugs include caffeine, commonly found in coffee, tea, soft drinks, and chocolate; alcohol, commonly found in beer, wine, cocktails, and distilled spirits; nicotine, commonly found in tobacco, tobacco-based products, and electronic cigarettes; cannabis and hashish (with legality of possession varying inter/intra-nationally); and the controlled substances listed as controlled drugs in the Single Convention on Narcotic Drugs (1961) and the Convention on Psychotropic Substances (1971) of the United Nations (UN). Since the early 2000s, the European Union (EU) has developed several comprehensive and multidisciplinary strategies as part of its drug policy in order to prevent the diffusion of recreational drug use and abuse among the European population and raise public awareness on the adverse effects of drugs among all member states of the European Union, as well as conjoined efforts with European law enforcement agencies, such as Europol and EMCDDA, in order to counter organized crime and illegal drug trade in Europe.

== Reasons for use ==
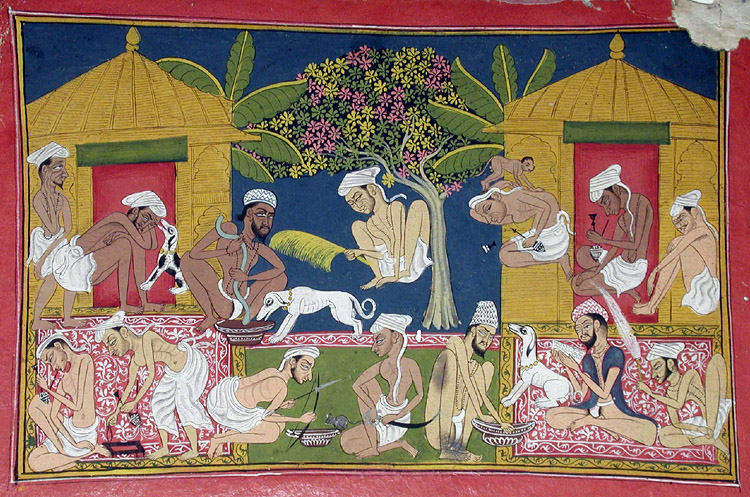
Bhang eaters from India, c. 1790; Bhang is an edible preparation of cannabis native to the Indian subcontinent. It has been used in food and drink as early as 1000 BCE by Hindus in ancient India.

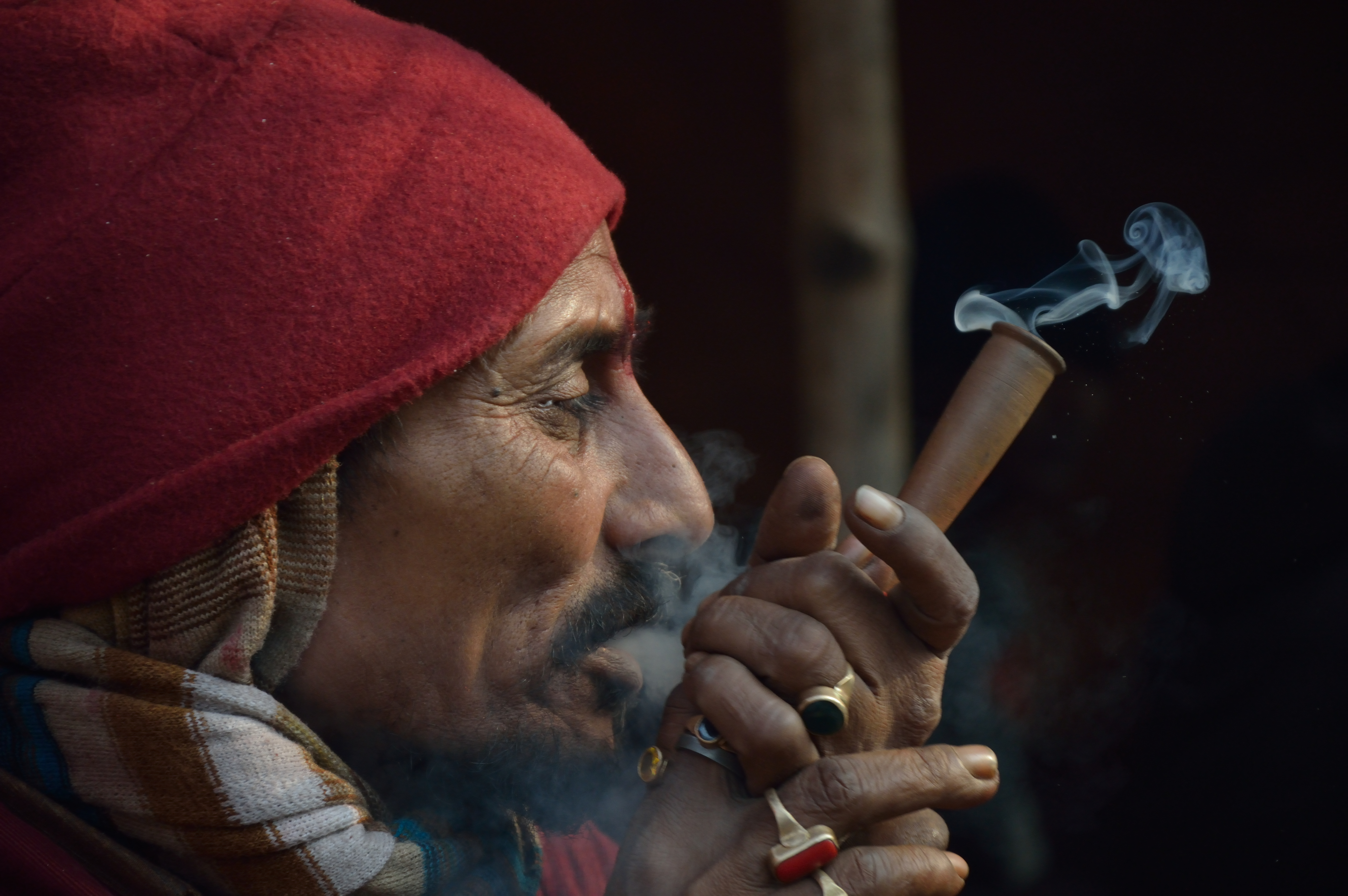
A man smoking cannabis through a pipe in Kolkata, India

Many researchers have explored the etiology of recreational drug use. Some of the most common theories are: genetics, personality type, psychological problems, self-medication, sex, age, depression, curiosity, boredom, rebelliousness, a sense of belonging to a group, family, and attachment issues, history of trauma, failure at school or work, socioeconomic stressors, peer pressure, juvenile delinquency, availability, historical factors, and/or socio-cultural influences. There has been no consensus on a single cause. Instead, experts tend to apply the biopsychosocial model. Any number of factors may influence an individual's drug use, as they are not mutually exclusive. Regardless of genetics, mental health, or traumatic experiences, social factors play a large role in the exposure to and availability of certain types of drugs and patterns of use.

According to addiction researcher Martin A. Plant, some people go through a period of self-redefinition before initiating recreational drug use. They tend to view using drugs as part of a general lifestyle that involves belonging to a subculture that they associate with heightened status and the challenging of social norms. Plant states: "From the user's point of view there are many positive reasons to become part of the milieu of drug taking. The reasons for drug use appear to have as much to do with needs for friendship, pleasure and status as they do with unhappiness or poverty. Becoming a drug taker, to many people, is a positive affirmation rather than a negative experience".

=== Evolution ===
Anthropological research has suggested that humans "may have evolved to counter-exploit plant neurotoxins". The ability to use botanical chemicals to serve the function of endogenous neurotransmitters may have improved survival rates, conferring an evolutionary advantage. A typically restrictive prehistoric diet may have emphasized the apparent benefit of consuming psychoactive drugs, which had themselves evolved to imitate neurotransmitters. Chemical–ecological adaptations and the genetics of hepatic enzymes, particularly cytochrome P450, have led researchers to propose that "humans have shared a co-evolutionary relationship with psychotropic plant substances that is millions of years old."

== Health risks ==
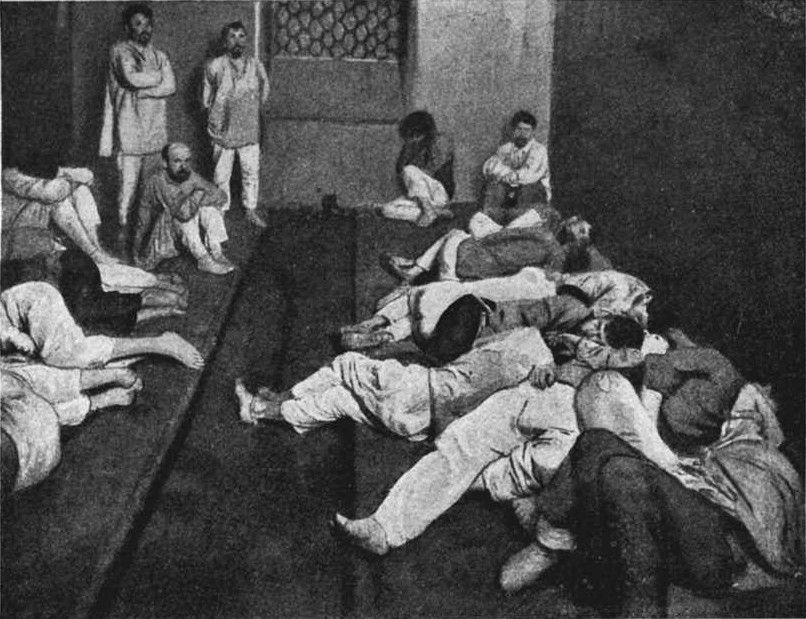
A 1914 photo of intoxicated men in a sobering-up room

Radar plot of 20 widely used recreational drugs by dependence likelihood and physical and social harms

The severity of impact and type of risks that come with recreational drug use vary widely with the drug in question and the amount being used. There are many factors in the environment and within the user that interact with each drug differently. Alcohol is sometimes considered one of the most dangerous recreational drugs. Alcoholic drinks, tobacco products and other nicotine-based products (e.g., electronic cigarettes), and cannabis are regarded by various medical professionals as the most common and widespread gateway drugs. In the United States, Australia, and New Zealand, the general onset of drinking alcohol, tobacco smoking, cannabis smoking, and consumption of multiple drugs most frequently occurs during adolescence and in middle school and secondary school settings.

Some scientific studies in the early 21st century found that a low to moderate level of alcohol consumption, particularly of red wine, might have substantial health benefits such as decreased risk of cardiovascular diseases, stroke, and cognitive decline. This claim has been disputed, specifically by British researcher David Nutt, professor of neuropsychopharmacology at the Imperial College London, who stated that studies showing benefits for "moderate" alcohol consumption in "some middle-aged men" lacked controls for the variable of what the subjects were drinking beforehand. Experts in the United Kingdom have suggested that some psychoactive drugs that may be causing less harm to fewer users (although they are also used less frequently in the first place) are cannabis, psilocybin mushrooms, LSD, and MDMA; however, these drugs have risks and side effects of their own.

=== Drug harmfulness ===
Chart of drug dependence potential and relationship between use and lethal dose

Chart of relative harmfulness of some psychoactive substances

Drug harmfulness is defined as the degree to which a psychoactive drug has the potential to cause harm to the user and is measured in several ways, such as by addictiveness and the potential for physical harm. More objectively harmful drugs may be colloquially referred to as "hard drugs", and less harmful drugs as "soft drugs". The term "soft drug" is considered controversial by critics as it may imply the false belief that soft drugs cause lesser or insignificant harm.

=== Responsible use ===
Responsible drug use advocates that users should not take drugs at the same time as activities such as driving, swimming, operating machinery, or other activities that are unsafe without a sober state. Responsible drug use is emphasized as a primary prevention technique in harm-reduction drug policies. Harm-reduction policies were popularized in the late 1980s, although they began in the 1970s counter-culture, through cartoons explaining responsible drug use and the consequences of irresponsible drug use to users. Another issue is that the illegality of drugs causes social and economic consequences for users—the drugs may be "cut" with adulterants and the purity varies wildly, making overdoses more likely—and legalization of drug production and distribution could reduce these and other dangers of illegal drug use.

== Prevention ==
In efforts to curtail recreational drug use, governments worldwide introduced several laws prohibiting the possession of almost all varieties of recreational drugs during the 20th century. The "war on drugs" promoted by the United States, however, is now facing increasing criticism. Evidence is insufficient to tell if behavioral interventions help prevent recreational drug use in children.

One in four adolescents in the United States has used an illegal drug, and one in ten of those adolescents who need addiction treatment get some type of care. School-based programs are the most commonly used method for drug use education; however, the success rates of these intervention programs are highly dependent on the commitment of participants and are limited in general.

== Demographics ==
=== Australia ===
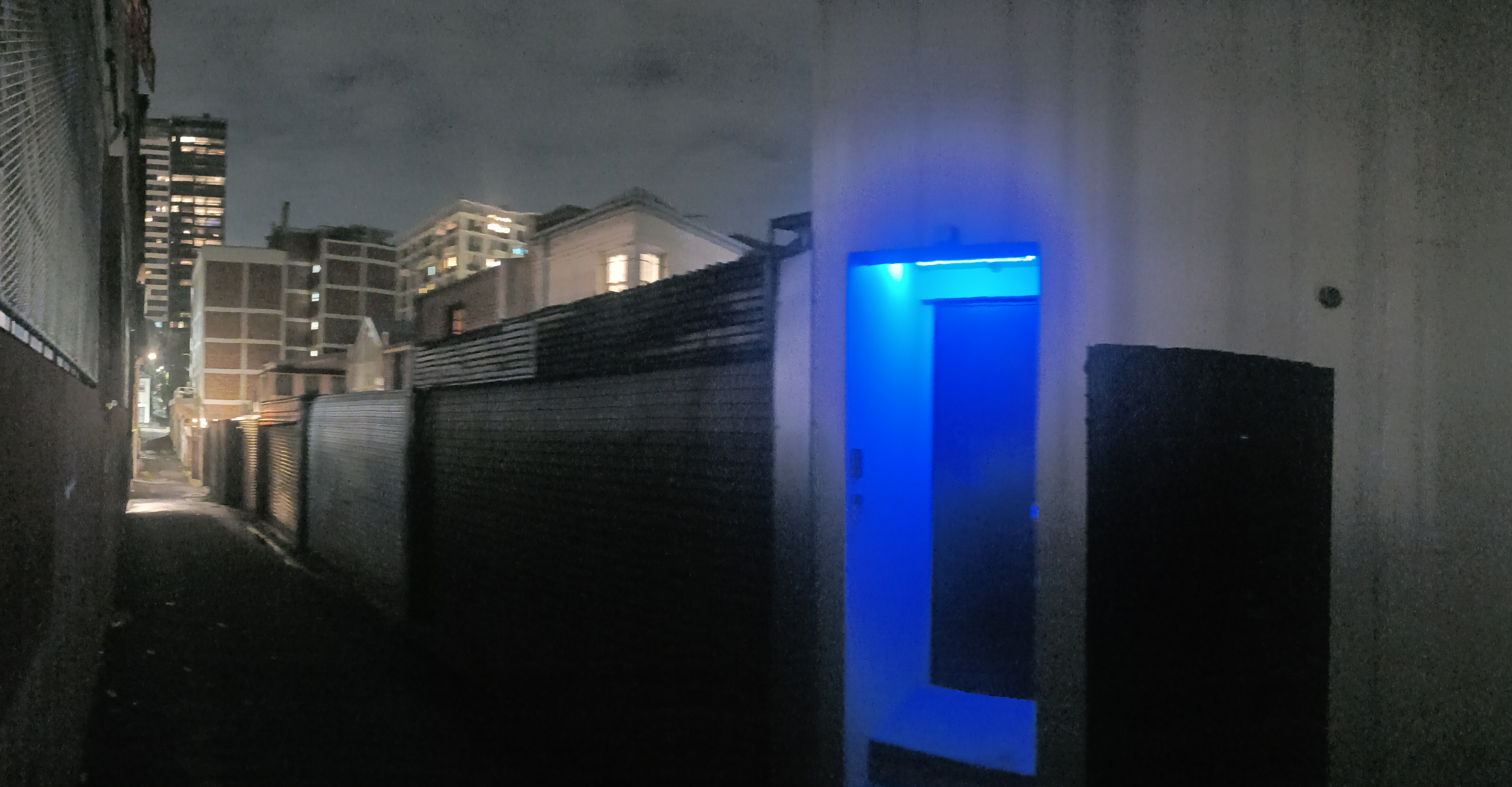
An alleyway in Darlinghurst, Sydney with a blue light to prevent intravenous drug use. 2026.

The 2016 national drug strategy household survey showed that alcohol is the most widely used recreational drug in Australia with at least 86.2% of Australians aged 12 years and over having consumed alcohol at least once in their lifetime, compared to 34.8% of Australians aged 12 years and over who have used cannabis at least once in their lifetime.

The survey also found that in the 12 months prior to the survey being taken at least 10.4% of all Australians had smoked cannabis at least once.

=== Europe ===
The 2026 European drug report, published by the European Union Drugs Agency, found that in a one year period prior ot the report being published that approximately 8.7% of all people in Europe aged between 15 to 64 had used cannabis during this period. This figure of 8.7% of all people in Europe is equivalent to around 25 million people. The report also found that for people aged 15 to 34 there was around 15.4 million people or roughly 15.3% who had used cannabis during this same one year period prior to the report being published. As well as this, the report found that 18% of 15 to 24 year olds reported they had used cannabis recently with there being 13% of people aged 15 to 16 who reported having used cannabis at least once in their lifetime. During this same period there was nearly 4.5 million people who reported using cannabis daily or almost daily.

The 2026 European drug report also found that an estimated 850,000 people or around 0.3% of the EU adult population used opioids in 2024 with there being 860 000 people using opioids in 2023. The same report also estimated that there were 505 000 people who received opioid agonist treatment for opioid drug addiction in EU Member States in 2024 with there being 511 000 people in 2023.

Another report also published by the European Union Drugs Agency that conducted an analysis of wastewater samples for the presence of drug use in cities across Europe, found that more than 75% of cities had higher concentrations of cocaine and MDMA in wastewater during weekends indicating that these drugs are more often used in nightlife and recreational settings. It also found that of the cities tested about half of them found that ketamine use spiked on weekends. The same analysis of wastewater also found that cannabis, amphetamine and methamphetamine appear consistently throughout the week suggesting that people may use these drugs daily or for a non-recreational use.

=== United States ===
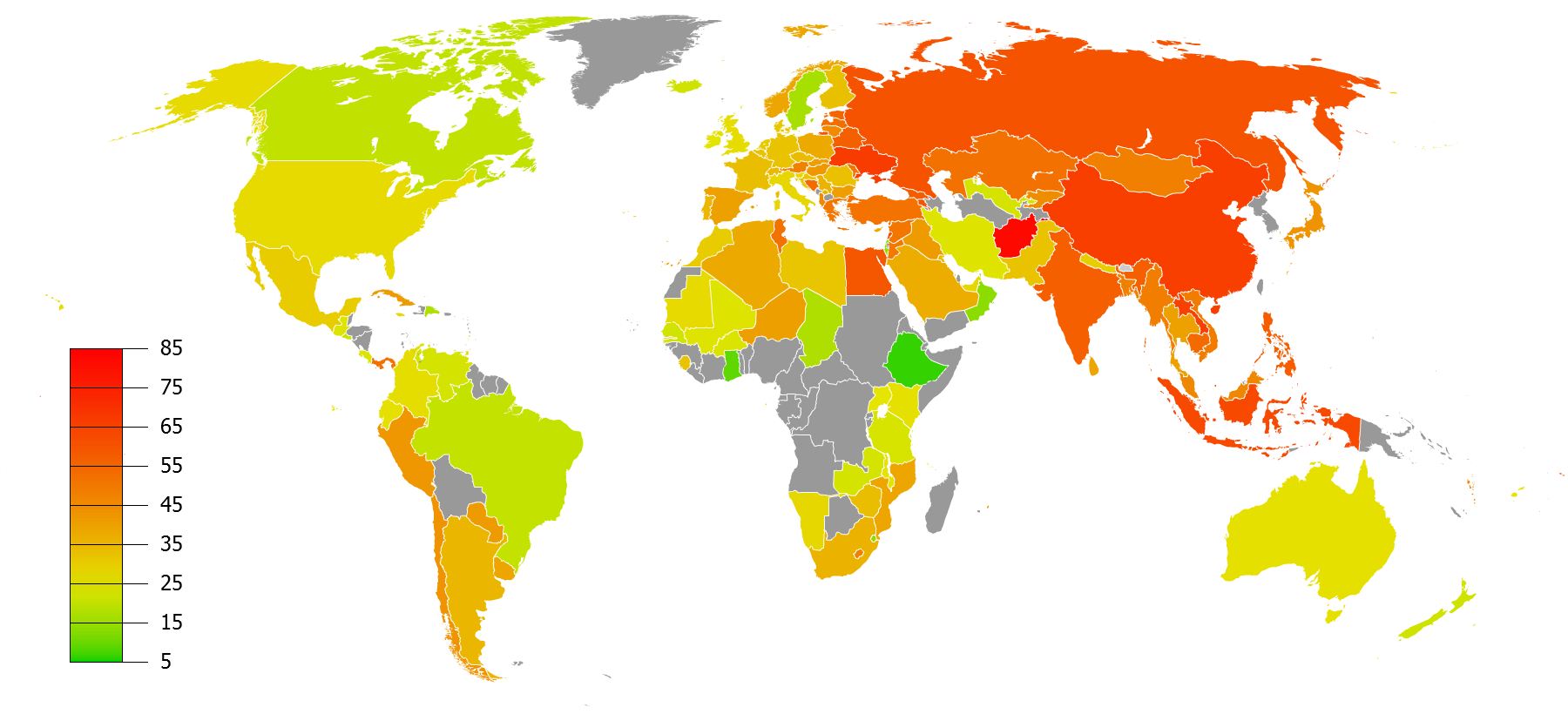
Smoking any tobacco product, %, males

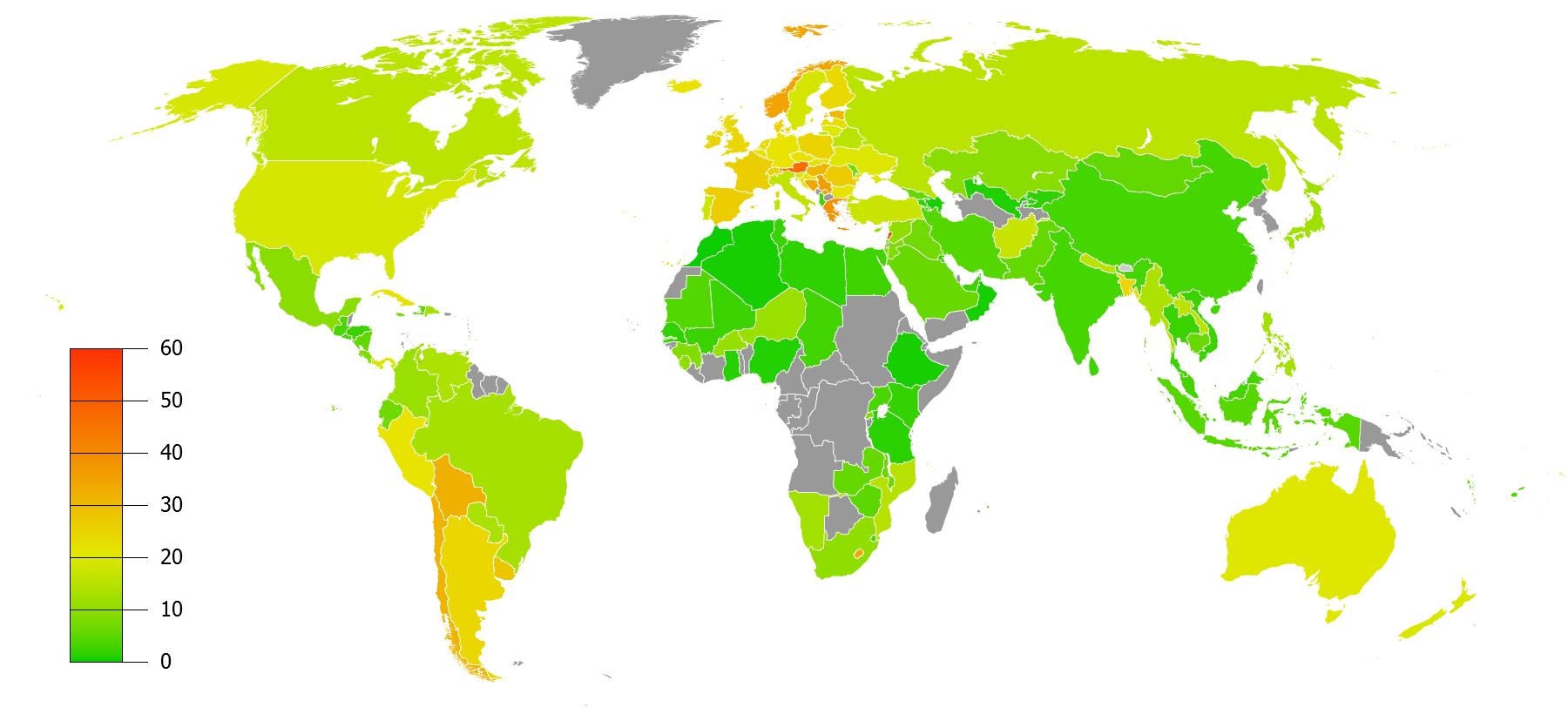
Smoking any tobacco product, %, females

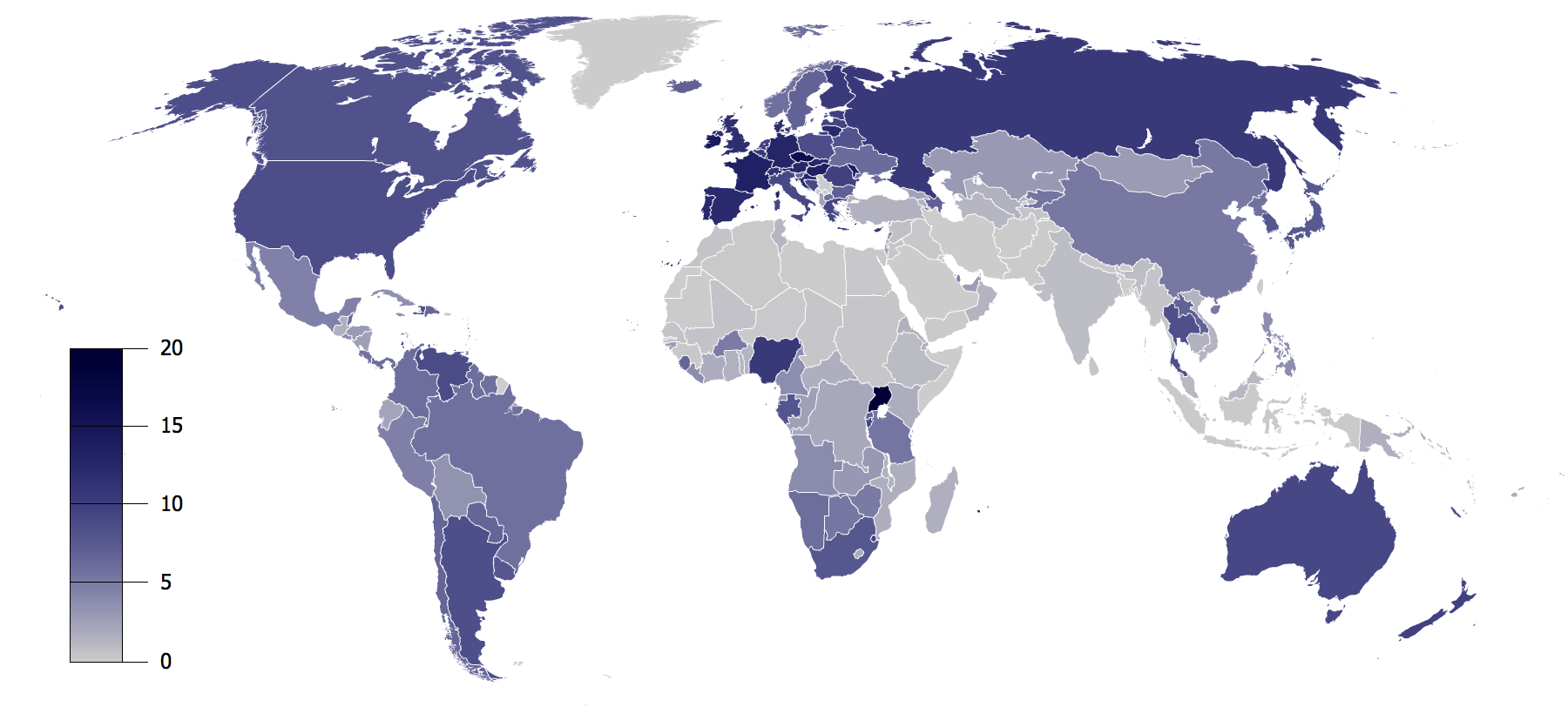
Total recorded alcohol per capita consumption (15+), in liters of pure alcohol

From the mid-19th century to the 1930s, American physicians prescribed Cannabis sativa as a prescription drug for various medical conditions. In the 1960s, the counterculture movement introduced the use of psychoactive drugs, including cannabis. Young adults and college students reported the recreational prevalence of cannabis, among other drugs, at 20-25% while the cultural mindset of using was open and curious. In 1969, the FBI reported that between the years 1966 and 1968, the number of arrests for marijuana possession, which had been outlawed throughout the United States under Marijuana Tax Act of 1937, had increased by 98%. Despite acknowledgement that drug use was greatly growing among America's youth during the late 1960s, surveys have suggested that only as much as 4% of the American population had ever smoked marijuana by 1969. By 1972, however, that number would increase to 12%. That number would then double by 1977.

The Controlled Substances Act of 1970 classified marijuana along with heroin and LSD as a Schedule I drug, i.e., having the relatively highest abuse potential and no accepted medical use. Most marijuana at that time came from Mexico, but in 1975 the Mexican government agreed to eradicate the crop by spraying it with the herbicide paraquat, raising fears of toxic side effects. Colombia then became the main supplier. The "zero tolerance" climate of the Reagan and Bush administrations (1981–1993) resulted in passage of strict laws and mandatory sentences for possession of marijuana. The "war on drugs" thus brought with it a shift from reliance on imported supplies to domestic cultivation, particularly in Hawaii and California. Beginning in 1982, the Drug Enforcement Administration turned increased attention to marijuana farms in the United States, and there was a shift to the indoor growing of plants specially developed for small size and high yield. After over a decade of decreasing use, marijuana smoking began an upward trend once more in the early 1990s, especially among teenagers, but by the end of the decade this upswing had leveled off well below former peaks of use.

=== In Anthropology ===
An anthropological lens challenges the idea that drug use is a universal problem, instead suggesting that perceptions of substance use and addiction depend on social, historical, political and cultural context. Drug policy and public responses vary globally, with disparities between the United Kingdom, Australia, and the United States. In the UK, drug use has become framed on crime prevention and coercion of drug users, demonstrating that definitions of harm are culturally and politically bound, questioning who health policies benefit. The USA has focused on the criminalisation of drug use, framing drug users as “morally reprehensible” and “deviant criminals”, shaping drug use as an issue of crime and social order. Australia’s 1985 adoption of harm minimisation strategies highlights that policy can shift alongside historical circumstances. The HIV/AIDS epidemic prompted a focus on safe injecting, rather than eradicating drug use. Maher and Dixon’s ethnographic research revealed that “attempts to suppress or control” drug use can shape how it is carried out, demonstrating that drug policy can shape experiences of harm. These cases corroborate Singer’s idea that drug use must be understood in its context, which challenges the narrative that drug-related harm is solely the users’ responsibility.

== Society and culture ==
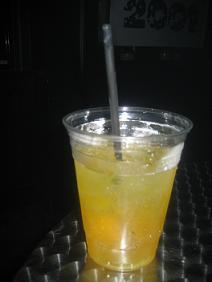
Caffeinated alcoholic beverages, such as Vodka Red Bull, are widespread and legal routes of administration for multiple drugs.

Many movements and organizations are advocating for or against the liberalization of the use of recreational drugs, most notably regarding the legalization of marijuana and cannabinoids for medical and/or recreational use. Subcultures have emerged among users of recreational drugs, in addition to alternative lifestyles and social movements among those who abstain from them, such as teetotalism and "straight edge".

Since the early 2000s, medical professionals have acknowledged and addressed the problem of the increasing consumption of alcoholic drinks and club drugs (such as MDMA, cocaine, rohypnol, GHB, ketamine, PCP, LSD, and methamphetamine) associated with rave culture among adolescents and young adults in the Western world. Studies have shown that adolescents are more likely than young adults to use multiple drugs, and the consumption of club drugs is highly associated with the presence of criminal behaviors and recent alcohol abuse or dependence.

The prevalence of recreational drugs in human societies is widely reflected in fiction, entertainment, and the arts, subject to prevailing laws and social conventions. For instance, in the music industry, the musical genres hip-hop, hardcore rap, and trap, alongside their derivative subgenres and subcultures, are most notorious for having continuously celebrated and promoted drug trafficking, gangster lifestyle, and consumption of alcohol and other drugs since their inception in the United States during the late 1980s–early 1990s. In video games, for example, drugs are portrayed in a variety of ways: including power-ups (cocaine gum replenishes stamina in Red Dead Redemption 2), obstacles to be avoided (such as the Fuzzies in Super Mario World 2: Yoshi's Island that distort the player's view when accidentally consumed), items to be bought and sold for in-game currency (coke dealing is a big part of Scarface: The World Is Yours). In the Fallout video game franchise, drugs ("chems" in the game) can fill the role of any above mentioned. Drug trafficking, gang rivalries, and their related criminal underworld also play a big part in the Grand Theft Auto video game franchise.

== Common recreational drugs ==
The following substances are commonly used recreationally:

- Alcohol: Most drinking alcohol is ethanol, CH_{3}CH_{2}OH. Drinking alcohol creates intoxication, relaxation and lowered inhibitions. It is produced by the fermentation of sugars by yeasts to create wine, beer, and distilled liquor (e.g., vodka, rum, gin, etc.). In most areas of the world, it is legal for those over a certain age (18 in most countries). It is an IARC Group 1 carcinogen and a teratogen. Alcohol withdrawal can be life-threatening.
- Amphetamines: Used recreationally to provide alertness and a sense of energy. Prescribed for ADHD, narcolepsy, depression, and weight loss. A potent central nervous system stimulant, in the 1940s and 50s methamphetamine was used by Axis and Allied troops in World War II, and, later on, other armies, and by Japanese factory workers. It increases muscle strength and fatigue resistance and improves reaction time. Methamphetamine use can be neurotoxic, which means it damages dopamine neurons. As a result of this brain damage, chronic use can lead to post acute withdrawal syndrome.
- Caffeine: Often found in coffee, black tea, energy drinks, some soft drinks (e.g., Coca-Cola, Pepsi, and Mountain Dew, among others), and chocolate. It is the world's most widely consumed psychoactive drug, but has only mild dependence liability for long-term users.
- Cannabis: Its common forms include marijuana and hashish, which are smoked, vaporized or eaten. It contains at least 85 cannabinoids. The primary psychoactive component is THC, which mimics the neurotransmitter anandamide, named after the Sanskrit word ananda meaning "joy, bliss, delight". When cannabis is eaten, THC is metabolized into 11-OH-THC; this molecule is the primary psychoactive compound of edible forms of cannabis. THC and 11-OH-THC are partial agonist at CB1 and CB2 receptors of the endocannabinoid system.
- Cocaine: It is available as a white powder, which is insufflated ("sniffed" into the nostrils) or converted into a solution with water and injected. A popular derivative, crack cocaine is typically smoked. When transformed into its freebase form, crack, the cocaine vapour may be inhaled directly. This is thought to increase bioavailability, but has also been found to be toxic, due to the production of methylecgonidine during pyrolysis.
- MDMA: Commonly known as ecstasy, it is a common club drug in the rave scene.
- Ketamine: An anesthetic used legally by paramedics and doctors in emergency situations for its dissociative and analgesic qualities and illegally in the club drug scene.
- Lean: A liquid drug mixture made when mixing cough syrup, sweets, soft drinks and codeine. It originated in the 1990s in Houston. Ever since then, this drug usage has grown and is often used at parties and in the trap music scene. Many people would get a drowsy feeling when consuming this drug.
- LSD: A popular ergoline derivative, that was first synthesized in 1938 by Albert Hofmann. However, he failed to notice its psychedelic effects until 1943. It's a serotonergic psychedelic (partial agonist at serotonin receptors, particularly the 5-HT2A subtypes) like psilocin, mescaline and DMT. But LSD is unique because it is also a partial agonist of dopamine and norepinephrine receptors, particularly the D2R subtypes. LSD (d-Lysergic Acid Diethylamide) is a molecule of the lysergamide family, a subclass of the tryptamine family. In the 1950s, it was used in psychological therapy, and, covertly, by the CIA in Project MKULTRA, in which the drug was administered to unwitting US and Canadian citizens. It played a central role in 1960s 'counter-culture', and was banned in October 1968 by US President Lyndon B Johnson.
- Nitrous oxide: legally used by dentists as an anxiolytic and anaesthetic, it is also used recreationally by users who obtain it from whipped cream canisters (whippets or whip-its) (see inhalant), as it causes perceptual effects, a "high" and at higher doses, hallucinations.
- Opiates and opioids: Available by prescription for pain relief. Commonly used opioids include oxycodone, hydrocodone, codeine, fentanyl, heroin, methadone, and morphine. Opioids have a high potential for addiction and have the ability to induce severe physical withdrawal symptoms upon cessation of frequent use. Heroin can be smoked, insufflated, or turned into a solution with water and injected. Percocet is a prescription opioid containing oxycodone and acetaminophen.
- Psilocybin mushrooms: This hallucinogenic drug was an important drug in the psychedelic scene. Until 1963, when it was chemically analysed by Albert Hofmann, it was completely unknown to modern science that Psilocybe semilanceata ("Liberty Cap", common throughout Europe) contains psilocybin, a hallucinogen previously identified only in species native to Mexico, Asia, and North America.
- Tobacco: Nicotiana tabacum. Nicotine is the key drug contained in tobacco leaves, which are either smoked, chewed or snuffed. It contains nicotine, which crosses the blood–brain barrier in 10–20 seconds. It mimics the action of the neurotransmitter acetylcholine at nicotinic acetylcholine receptors in the brain and the neuromuscular junction. The neuronal forms of the receptor are present both post-synaptically (involved in classical neurotransmission) and pre-synaptically, where they can influence the release of multiple neurotransmitters.
- Tranquilizers: barbiturates, benzodiazepines (e.g. alprazolam, diazepam, etc.)(commonly prescribed for anxiety disorders; known to cause dementia and post acute withdrawal syndrome)
- "Bath salts": slang term that generally refers to substituted cathinones such as Mephedrone and Methylenedioxypyrovalerone (MDPV), but not always
- DMT – primary ingredient in ayahuasca, can also be smoked (inhalation causes a brief effect lasting usually 5 to 15 minutes).
- Peyote: This hallucinogen contains mescaline, native to southwestern Texas and Mexico. Echinopsis pachanoi and Echinopsis langeniformis are faster growing cacti containing mescaline. It is one of the few hallucinogens legally available in the United States for religious purposes by the Native American Church.
- Salvia divinorum: This hallucinogenic Mexican herb in the mint family; not considered recreational, most likely due to the nature of the hallucinations (legal in some jurisdictions)
- Synthetic cannabis: "Spice", "K2", JWH-018, AM-2201
- Quaaludes: A popular club drug in the 1970s. No longer prescribed or manufactured in many countries but remains popular in South Africa.

== Routes of administration ==
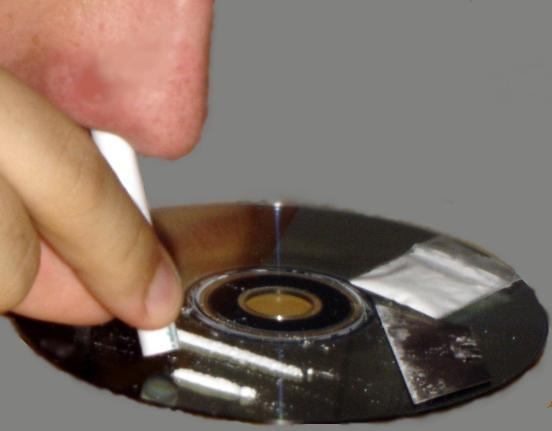
Insufflation of powdered drug

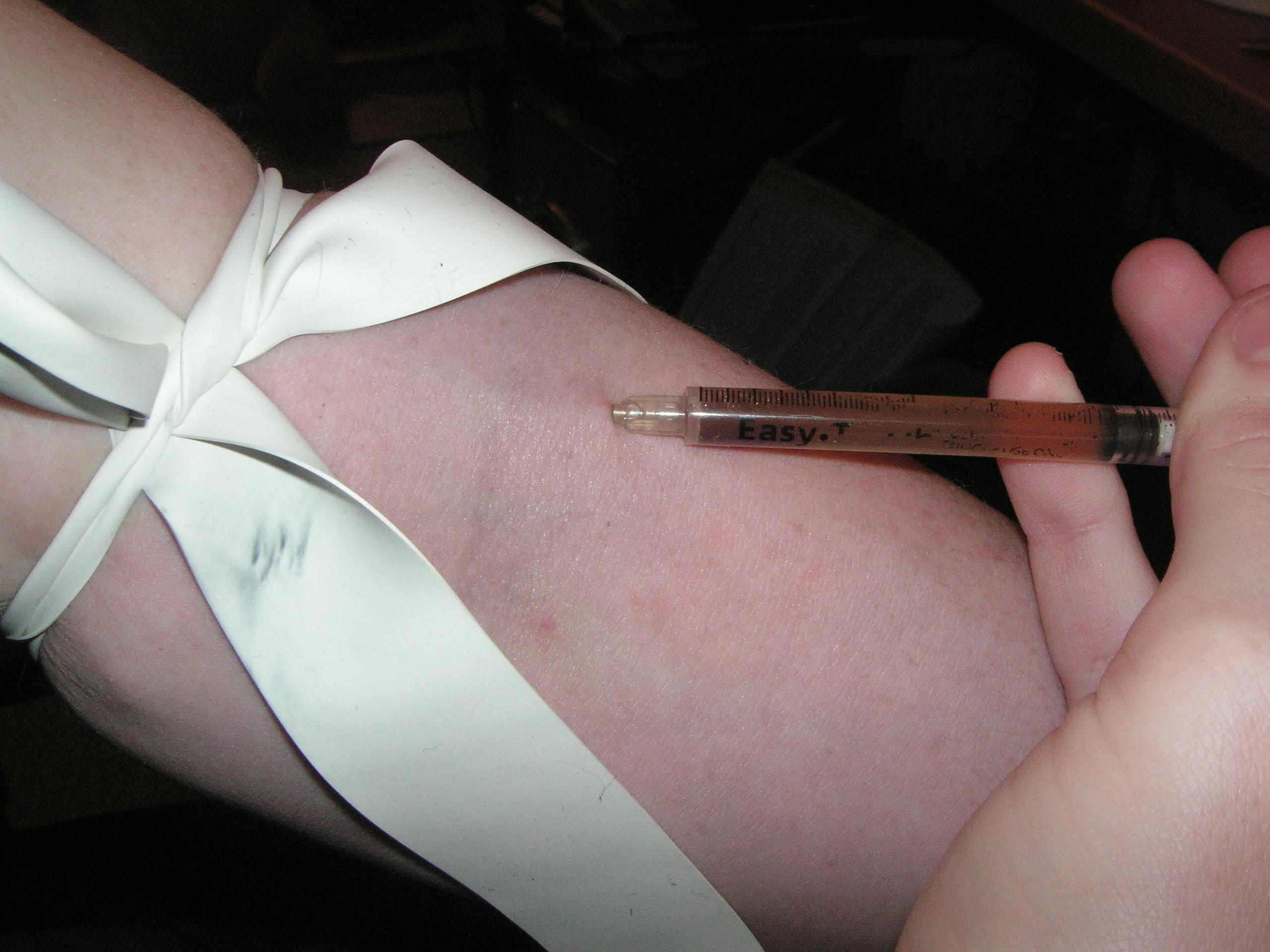
Injection of heroin

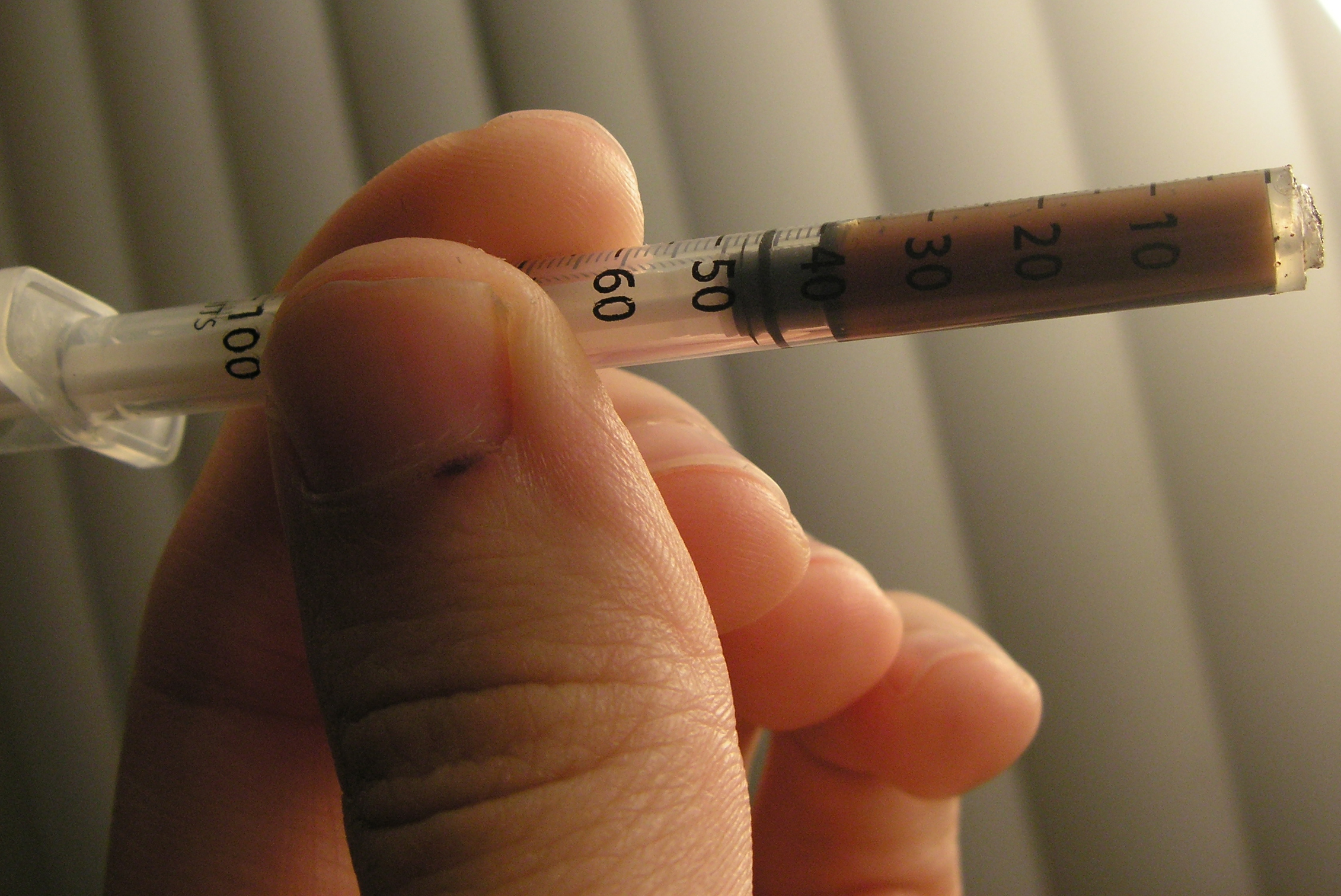
A modified hypodermic syringe used for rectal administration ("plugging") of heroin.

Drugs are often associated with a particular route of administration. Many drugs can be consumed in more than one way. For example, marijuana can be swallowed like food or smoked, and cocaine can be "sniffed" in the nostrils, injected, or, with various modifications, smoked.

- inhalation: all intoxicative inhalants (see below) that are gases or solvent vapours that are inhaled through the trachea, as the name suggests
- insufflation: also known as "snorting", or "sniffing", this method involves the user placing a powder in the nostrils and breathing in through the nose, so that the drug is absorbed by the mucous membranes. Drugs that are "snorted", or "sniffed", include powdered amphetamines, cocaine, heroin, ketamine, MDMA, and snuff tobacco.
- Subcutaneous injection (see also the article Skin popping): injection of drug into the third lowest layer of skin.
- Intramuscular injection: injection of drug into a muscle.
- intravenous injection (see also the article Drug injection): the user injects a solution of water and the drug into a vein, or less commonly, into the tissue. Drugs that are injected include morphine and heroin, less commonly other opioids. Stimulants like cocaine or methamphetamine may also be injected. In rare cases, users inject other drugs.
- oral intake: caffeine, ethanol, cannabis edibles, psilocybin mushrooms, coca tea, poppy tea, laudanum, GHB, ecstasy pills with MDMA or various other substances (mainly stimulants and psychedelics), prescription and over-the-counter drugs (ADHD and narcolepsy medications, benzodiazepines, anxiolytics, sedatives, cough suppressants, morphine, codeine, opioids and others)
- sublingual: substances diffuse into the blood through tissues under the tongue. Many psychoactive drugs can be or have been specifically designed for sublingual administration, including barbiturates, benzodiazepines, opioid analgesics with poor gastrointestinal bioavailability, LSD blotters, coca leaves, some hallucinogens. This route of administration is activated when chewing some forms of smokeless tobacco (e.g. dipping tobacco, snus).
- intrarectal ("plugging"): administering into the rectum, most water-soluble drugs can be used this way.
- smoking (see also the section below): tobacco, cannabis, opium, crystal meth, phencyclidine, crack cocaine, and heroin (diamorphine as freebase) known as chasing the dragon.
- transdermal patches with prescription drugs: e.g. methylphenidate (Daytrana) and fentanyl.

Many drugs are taken through various routes. Intravenous route is the most efficient, but also one of the most dangerous. Nasal, rectal, inhalation and smoking are safer. The oral route is one of the safest and most comfortable, but for some drugs has poorer bioavailability.

== Types ==
=== Depressants ===
Depressants are psychoactive drugs that temporarily diminish the function or activity of a specific part of the body or mind. Colloquially, depressants are known as "downers", and users generally take them to feel more relaxed and less tense. Examples of these kinds of effects may include anxiolysis, sedation, and hypotension. Depressants are widely used throughout the world as prescription medicines and as illicit substances. When these are used, effects may include anxiolysis (reduction of anxiety), analgesia (pain relief), sedation, somnolence, cognitive/memory impairment, dissociation, muscle relaxation, lowered blood pressure/heart rate, respiratory depression, anesthesia, and anticonvulsant effects. Depressants exert their effects through a number of different pharmacological mechanisms, the most prominent of which include potentiation of GABA or opioid activity, and inhibition of adrenergic, histamine or acetylcholine activity. Some are also capable of inducing feelings of euphoria. The most widely used depressant by far is alcohol (i.e. ethanol).

Stimulants or "uppers", such as amphetamines or cocaine, which increase mental or physical function, have an opposite effect to depressants.

Depressants, in particular alcohol, can precipitate psychosis. A 2019 systematic review and meta-analysis by Murrie et al. found that the rate of transition from opioid, alcohol and sedative induced psychosis to schizophrenia was 12%, 10% and 9% respectively.

==== Antihistamines ====
Antihistamines (or "histamine antagonists") inhibit the release or action of histamine. "Antihistamine" can be used to describe any histamine antagonist, but the term is usually reserved for the classical antihistamines that act upon the H_{1} histamine receptor. Antihistamines are used as treatment for allergies. Allergies are caused by an excessive response of the body to allergens, such as the pollen released by grasses and trees. An allergic reaction causes release of histamine by the body. Other uses of antihistamines are to help with normal symptoms of insect stings even if there is no allergic reaction. Their recreational appeal exists mainly due to their anticholinergic properties, that induce anxiolysis and, in some cases such as diphenhydramine, chlorpheniramine, and orphenadrine, a characteristic euphoria at moderate doses. High dosages taken to induce recreational drug effects may lead to overdoses. Antihistamines are also consumed in combination with alcohol, particularly by youth who find it hard to obtain alcohol. The combination of the two drugs can cause intoxication with lower alcohol doses.

Hallucinations and possibly delirium resembling the effects of Datura stramonium can result if the drug is taken in much higher than therapeutic doses. Antihistamines are widely available over the counter at drug stores (without a prescription), in the form of allergy medication and some cough medicines. They are sometimes used in combination with other substances such as alcohol. The most common unsupervised use of antihistamines in terms of volume and percentage of the total is perhaps in parallel to the medicinal use of some antihistamines to extend and intensify the effects of opioids and depressants. The most commonly used are hydroxyzine, mainly to extend a supply of other drugs, as in medical use, and the above-mentioned ethanolamine and alkylamine-class first-generation antihistamines, which are – once again as in the 1950s – the subject of medical research into their anti-depressant properties.

For all of the above reasons, the use of medicinal scopolamine for recreational uses is also observed.

==== Analgesics ====
Analgesics (also known as "painkillers") are used to relieve pain (achieve analgesia). The word analgesic derives from Greek "αν-" (an-, "without") and "άλγος" (álgos, "pain"). Analgesic drugs act in various ways on the peripheral and central nervous systems; they include paracetamol (also known in the US as acetaminophen), the nonsteroidal anti-inflammatory drugs (NSAIDs) such as the salicylates (e.g. aspirin), and opioid drugs such as hydrocodone, codeine, heroin and oxycodone. Some further examples of the brand name prescription opiates and opioid analgesics that may be used recreationally include Vicodin, Lortab, Norco (hydrocodone), Avinza, Kapanol (morphine), Opana, Paramorphan (oxymorphone), Dilaudid, Palladone (hydromorphone), and OxyContin (oxycodone).

==== Tranquilizers ====
The following are examples of tranquilizers (GABAergics):

- Barbiturates
- Benzodiazepines
- Ethanol (drinking alcohol; ethyl alcohol)
- Nonbenzodiazepines
- Others
  - carisoprodol (Soma)
  - chloral hydrate
  - diethyl ether
  - ethchlorvynol (Placidyl; "jelly-bellies")
  - gamma-butyrolactone (GBL, a prodrug to GHB)
  - gamma-hydroxybutyrate (GHB; G; Xyrem; "Liquid Ecstasy", "Fantasy")
  - glutethimide (Doriden)
  - kava (from Piper methysticum; contains kavalactones)
  - ketamine, a phencyclidine (PCP) analog
  - meprobamate (Miltown)
  - methaqualone (Sopor, Mandrax; "Quaaludes")
  - phenibut
  - propofol (Diprivan), a general anesthetic
  - theanine (found in Camellia sinensis, the tea plant)
  - valerian (from Valeriana officinalis)

=== Stimulants ===
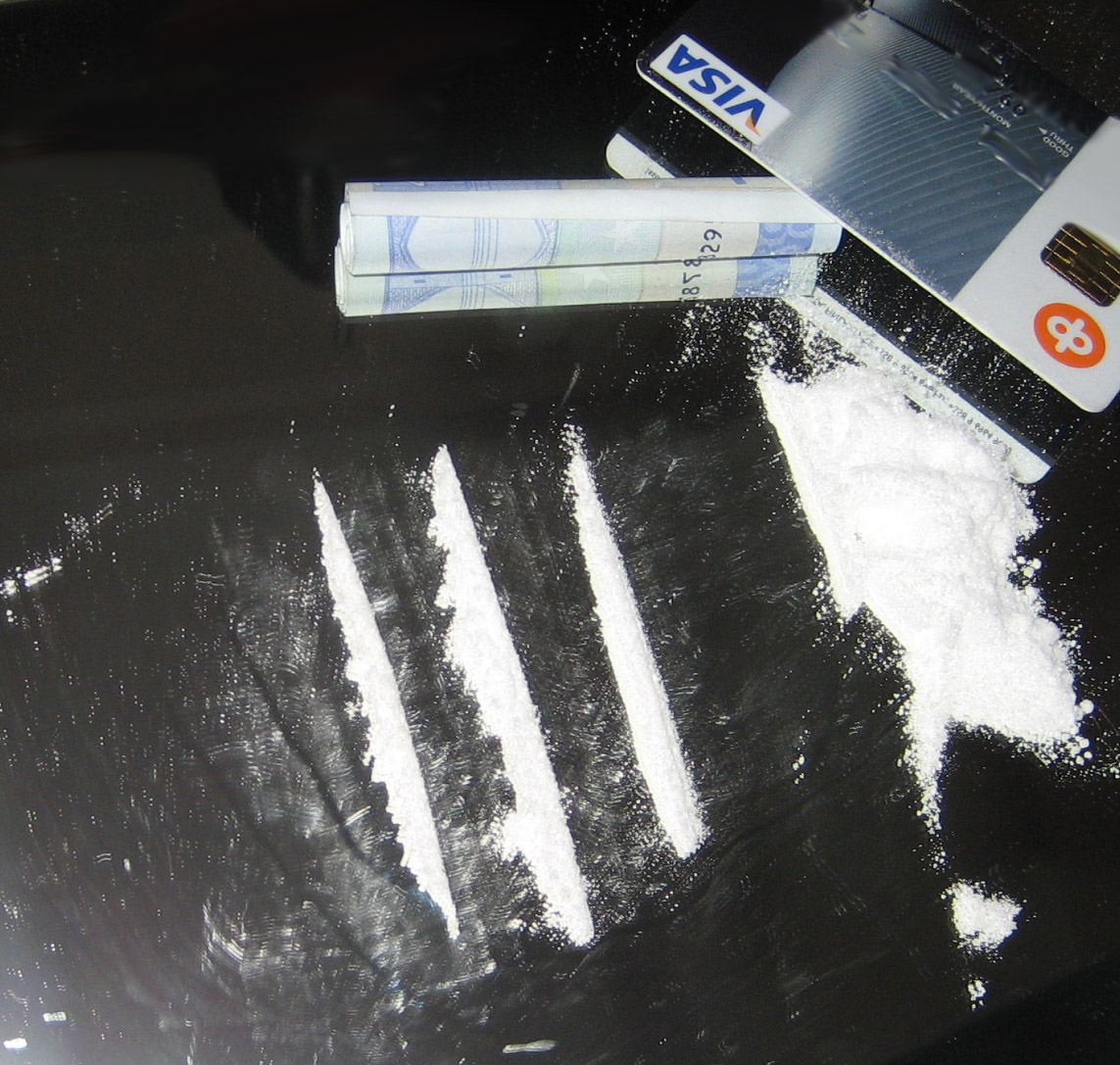
Cocaine is a commonly used stimulant.

Stimulants, also known as "psychostimulants", induce euphoria with improvements in mental and physical function, such as enhanced alertness, wakefulness, and locomotion. Stimulants are also occasionally called "uppers". Depressants or "downers", which decrease mental or physical function, are in stark contrast to stimulants and are considered to be their functional opposites.

Stimulants enhance the activity of the central and peripheral nervous systems. Common effects may include increased alertness, awareness, wakefulness, endurance, productivity, and motivation, arousal, locomotion, heart rate, and blood pressure, and a diminished desire for food and sleep.

Use of stimulants may cause the body to significantly reduce its production of endogenous compounds that fulfill similar functions. Once the effect of the ingested stimulant has worn off the user may feel depressed, lethargic, confused, and dysphoric. This is colloquially termed a "crash" and may promote reuse of the stimulant.

Amphetamines are a significant cause of drug-induced psychosis. Importantly, a 2019 meta-analysis found that 22% of people with amphetamine-induced psychosis transition to a later diagnosis of schizophrenia.

Examples of stimulants include:

- Sympathomimetics (catecholaminergics)—e.g. amphetamine, methamphetamine, cocaine, methylphenidate, ephedrine, pseudoephedrine
- Entactogens (serotonergics, primarily phenethylamines)—e.g. MDMA (which is also an amphetamine)
- Eugeroics, e.g. modafinil
- Others
  - arecoline (found in Areca catechu)
  - caffeine (found in Coffea spp.)
  - nicotine (found in Nicotiana spp.)
  - rauwolscine (found in Rauvolfia serpentina)
  - yohimbine (Procomil; a tryptamine alkaloid found in Pausinystalia johimbe)

=== Euphoriants ===
- Alcohol: "Euphoria, the feeling of well-being, has been reported during the early (10–15 min) phase of alcohol consumption" (e.g., beer, wine or spirits)
- Cannabis: Tetrahydrocannabinol, the main psychoactive ingredient in this plant, can have sedative and euphoric properties.
- Catnip: Catnip contains a sedative known as nepetalactone that activates opioid receptors. In cats it elicits sniffing, licking, chewing, head shaking, rolling, and rubbing which are indicators of pleasure. In humans, however, catnip does not act as a euphoriant.
- Stimulants: "Psychomotor stimulants produce locomotor activity (the subject becomes hyperactive), euphoria, (often expressed by excessive talking and garrulous behaviour), and anorexia. The amphetamines are the best known drugs in this category..."
- MDMA: The "euphoriant drugs such as MDMA ('ecstasy') and MDEA ('eve')" are popular among young adults. MDMA "users experience short-term feelings of euphoria, rushes of energy and increased tactility" as well as interpersonal connectedness.
- Opium: This "drug derived from the unripe seed-pods of the opium poppy…produces drowsiness and euphoria and reduces pain. Morphine and codeine are opium derivatives." Opioids have led to many deaths in the United States, particularly by causing respiratory depression.

=== Hallucinogens ===
Hallucinogens can be divided into three broad categories: psychedelics, dissociatives, and deliriants. They can cause subjective changes in perception, thought, emotion and consciousness. Unlike other psychoactive drugs such as stimulants and opioids, hallucinogens do not merely amplify familiar states of mind but also induce experiences that differ from those of ordinary consciousness, often compared to non-ordinary forms of consciousness such as trance, meditation, conversion experiences, and dreams.

Psychedelics, dissociatives, and deliriants have a long worldwide history of use within medicinal and religious traditions. They are used in shamanic forms of ritual healing and divination, in initiation rites, and in the religious rituals of syncretistic movements such as União do Vegetal, Santo Daime, Temple of the True Inner Light, and the Native American Church. When used in religious practice, psychedelic drugs, as well as other substances like tobacco, are referred to as entheogens.

Hallucinogen-induced psychotic disorder occurs when psychosis persists despite no longer being intoxicated with the drug. It is estimated that 26% of people with hallucinogen-induced psychotic disorder will transition to a diagnosis of schizophrenia. This percentage is less than the psychosis transition rate for cannabis (34%) but higher than that of amphetamines (22%).

Starting in the mid-20th century, psychedelic drugs have been the object of extensive attention in the Western world. They have been and are being explored as potential therapeutic agents in treating depression, post-traumatic stress disorder, obsessive–compulsive disorder, alcoholism, and opioid addiction. Yet the most popular, and at the same time most stigmatized, use of psychedelics in Western culture has been associated with the search for direct religious experience, enhanced creativity, personal development, and "mind expansion". The use of psychedelic drugs was a major element of the 1960s counterculture, where it became associated with various social movements and a general atmosphere of rebellion and strife between generations.

- Deliriants
  - atropine (alkaloid found in plants of the family Solanaceae, including datura, deadly nightshade, henbane and mandrake)
  - dimenhydrinate (Dramamine, an antihistamine)
  - diphenhydramine (Benadryl, Unisom, Nytol)
  - hyoscyamine (alkaloid also found in the Solanaceae)
  - hyoscine hydrobromide (another Solanaceae alkaloid)
  - myristicin (found in Myristica fragrans ("Nutmeg"))
  - ibotenic acid (found in Amanita muscaria ("Fly Agaric"); prodrug to muscimol)
  - muscimol (also found in Amanita muscaria, a GABAergic)
- Dissociatives
  - dextromethorphan (DXM; Robitussin, Delsym, etc.; "Dex", "Robo", "Cough Syrup", "DXM")
    - "Triple C's, Coricidin, Skittles" refer to a potentially fatal formulation containing both dextromethorphan and chlorpheniramine.
  - ketamine (K; Ketalar, Ketaset, Ketanest; "Ket", "Kit Kat", "Special-K", "Vitamin K", "Jet Fuel", "Horse Tranquilizer")
  - methoxetamine (Mex, Mket, Mexi)
  - phencyclidine (PCP; Sernyl; "Angel Dust", "Rocket Fuel", "Sherm", "Killer Weed", "Super Grass")
  - nitrous oxide (N_{2}O; "NOS", "Laughing Gas", "Whippets", "Balloons")
- Psychedelics
  - Phenethylamines
    - 2C-B ("Nexus", "Venus", "Eros", "Bees")
    - 2C-E ("Eternity", "Hummingbird")
    - 2C-I ("Infinity")
    - 2C-T-2 ("Rosy")
    - 2C-T-7 ("Blue Mystic", "Lucky 7")
    - DOB
    - DOC
    - DOI
    - DOM ("Serenity, Tranquility, and Peace" ("STP"))
    - MDMA ("Ecstasy", "E", "Molly", "Mandy", "MD", "Crystal Love")
    - mescaline (found in peyote and Trichocereus macrogonus (Peruvian torch, San Pedro cactus, Echinopsis langeniformis))
  - Tryptamines (including ergolines and lysergamides)
    - 5-MeO-DiPT ("Foxy", "Foxy Methoxy")
    - 5-MeO-DMT (found in various plants like chacruna, jurema, vilca, and yopo)
    - α-methyltryptamine (αMT; Indopan; "Spirals")
    - bufotenin (secreted by Bufo alvarius, also found in various Amanita mushrooms)
    - dimethyltryptamine (DMT; "Dimitri", "Disneyland", "Spice"; found in large amounts in Psychotria and in D. cabrerana)
    - lysergic acid amide (LSA; ergine; found in morning glory seeds)
    - lysergic acid diethylamide (LSD; L; Delysid; "Acid", "Sid". "Cid", "Lucy", "Sidney", "Blotters", "Droppers", "Sugar Cubes")
    - O-Acetylpsilocin (believed to be a prodrug of psilocin)
    - psilocin (found in psilocybin mushrooms)
    - psilocybin (also found in psilocybin mushrooms; prodrug to psilocin)
    - ibogaine (found in Tabernanthe iboga ("Iboga"))
- Atypicals
  - salvinorin A (found in Salvia divinorum, a trans-neoclerodane diterpenoid ("Diviner's Sage", "Lady Salvia", "Salvinorin"))
  - tetrahydrocannabinol (found in cannabis)

=== Inhalants ===
Inhalants are gases, aerosols, or solvents that are breathed in and absorbed through the lungs. While some "inhalant" drugs are used for medical purposes, as in the case of nitrous oxide, a dental anesthetic, inhalants are used as recreational drugs for their intoxicating effect. Most inhalant drugs that are used non-medically are ingredients in household or industrial chemical products that are not intended to be concentrated and inhaled, including organic solvents (found in cleaning products, fast-drying glues, and nail polish removers), fuels (gasoline (petrol) and kerosene), and propellant gases such as Freon and compressed hydrofluorocarbons that are used in aerosol cans such as hairspray, whipped cream, and non-stick cooking spray. A small number of recreational inhalant drugs are pharmaceutical products that are used illicitly, such as anesthetics (ether and nitrous oxide) and volatile anti-angina drugs (alkyl nitrites, more commonly known as "poppers").

The most serious inhalant abuse occurs among children and teens who "[...] live on the streets completely without family ties". Inhalant users inhale vapor or aerosol propellant gases using plastic bags held over the mouth or by breathing from a solvent-soaked rag or an open container. The effects of inhalants range from an alcohol-like intoxication and intense euphoria to vivid hallucinations, depending on the substance and the dosage. Some inhalant users are injured due to the harmful effects of the solvents or gases, or due to other chemicals used in the products inhaled. As with any recreational drug, users can be injured due to dangerous behavior while they are intoxicated, such as driving under the influence. Computer cleaning dusters are dangerous to inhale, because the gases expand and cool rapidly upon being sprayed. In many cases, users have died from hypoxia (lack of oxygen), pneumonia, cardiac failure or arrest, or aspiration of vomit.

Examples include:

- Chloroform
- Ethyl chloride
- Diethyl ether
- Ethane and ethylene
- Laughing gas (nitrous oxide)
- Poppers (alkyl nitrites)
- Solvents and propellants (including propane, butane, freon, gasoline, kerosene, toluene) along with the fumes of glues containing them

== List of drugs which can be smoked ==
Plants:

- black tar heroin
- cannabis
- datura and other Solanaceae (formerly smoked to treat asthma)
- opium
- salvia divinorum
- tobacco
- possibly other plants (see the section below)

Substances (also not necessarily psychoactive plants smoked within them):

- 5-MeO-DMT
- Bufotenine
- crack cocaine
- dimethyltryptamine (DMT)
- DiPT
- methamphetamine
- Methaqualone
- phencyclidine (PCP)
- synthetic cannabinoids (see also: synthetic cannabis)
- many others, including some prescription drugs

== List of psychoactive plants, fungi, and animals ==
Minimally psychoactive plants which contain mainly caffeine and theobromine:

- cocoa
- coffee
- guarana (caffeine in guarana is sometimes called guaranine)
- kola
- tea (caffeine in tea is sometimes called theine) – also contains theanine
- yerba mate (caffeine in yerba mate is sometimes called mateine)

Most known psychoactive plants:

- cannabis: cannabinoids
- coca: cocaine
- kava: kavalactones
- khat: cathine and cathinone
- nutmeg: myristicin and elemicin
- opium poppy: morphine, codeine, and other opiates
- salvia divinorum: salvinorin A
- tobacco: nicotine and beta-carboline alkaloids

Solanaceae plants—contain atropine, hyoscyamine, and scopolamine:

- datura
- deadly nightshade Atropa belladonna
- henbane
- mandrake (mandragora)
- other Solanaceae

Cacti with mescaline:

- Peyote
- Trichocereus macrogonus, the Peruvian torch cactus, Echinopsis langeniformis, and in particular its variety T. macrogonus var. pachanoi, the San Pedro cactus

Other plants:

- Areca catechu (see: betel and paan)—arecoline
- Ayahuasca (for DMT)
- Calea zacatechichi
- damiana
- ephedra: ephedrine
- kratom: mitragynine, mitraphylline, 7-hydroxymitragynine, raubasine, and corynanthine
- morning glory – lysergic acid amide (LSA, ergine) and others
- Rauvolfia serpentina: rauwolscine
- Silene capensis
- Tabernanthe iboga ("Iboga")—ibogaine
- valerian: valerian (the chemical with the same name)
- various plants like chacruna, jurema, vilca, and yopo – 5-MeO-DMT
- yohimbe (Pausinystalia johimbe): yohimbine and corynanthine
- many others

Fungi:

- various Amanita mushrooms: muscimol
- Amanita muscaria: ibotenic acid and muscimol
- Claviceps purpurea and other Clavicipitaceae: ergotamine (not psychoactive itself but used in synthesis of LSD)
- psilocybin mushrooms: psilocybin and psilocin

Psychoactive animals:

- hallucinogenic fish
- psychoactive toads: Bufo alvarius (Colorado River toad or Sonoran Desert toad) contains bufotenin (5-MeO-DMT)

== See also ==
=== Law and policy ===
- Approaches
  - Demand reduction
  - Harm reduction
  - Supply reduction
- Alcohol licensing laws of the United Kingdom
- Ban on caffeinated alcoholic drinks in the United States
- Drug policy
  - Drug checking
  - Drug education
  - Drug liberalization
  - Prohibition of drugs
- Drug rehabilitation
  - Drug addiction recovery groups
  - Native American temperance activists
  - Sober living environment
- Illegal drug trade
- Legalization of non-medical cannabis in the United States
- Over the counter drug
- Regulation of therapeutic goods

=== Pharmacology ===
- Effective dose
- Effects of cannabis
- Median lethal dose
- Psychopharmacology
- Psychotomimetism
- Toxicity

=== Tobacco-related topics ===
- Cigarette packets in Australia
- Flavored tobacco
- Prevalence of tobacco use
- Tobacco harm reduction
- Tobacco marketing targeting African Americans
- Tobacco packaging warning messages
- Usage of electronic cigarettes

=== Drug-related literature ===
- Confessions of an English Opium-Eater (1821)
- Fear and Loathing in Las Vegas (1971)
- Les Paradis artificiels (1860)
- Licit and Illicit Drugs (1972)
- Marihuana: The First Twelve Thousand Years (1980)
- Methland (2009)
- Smoke and Mirrors: The War on Drugs and the Politics of Failure (1996)
- The Doors of Perception (1954)
- The Hasheesh Eater (1857)
- This Is Your Country On Drugs (2009)

=== Other topics ===
- Counterfeit medications
- Designer drug
- Gateway drug effect
- List of psychoactive drugs
- Polysubstance use and abuse
- Project MKUltra
- Project SCUM
- Psychedelic experience
- Recreational drug use in animals
- Recreational use of dextromethorphan
- Recreational use of ketamine
- Victimless crime
