= Emily Dufton =

American author

Dufton at the Politics and Prose bookstore in 2026

Emily Dufton is an American author on the history of United States drug policy.

Her first book, Grass Roots: The Rise and Fall of Marijuana in America, based on her doctoral thesis at George Washington University Department of American Studies, was called "a comprehensive history of marijuana legalization in America" by Kirkus Reviews, and "a new milestone in the literature on drugs" in The American Historical Review.

Her 2026 book Addiction, Inc "explores the nation's history of drug treatment for opioid addiction from the golden era of treatment in the early 1970s to the current day".

Dufton hosts a channel on New Books Network devoted to drugs and drug addiction.

== Bibliography ==
- Addiction, Inc.: Medication-Assisted Treatment and America's Forgotten War on Drugs. University of Chicago Press. April 2026.
- Grass Roots: The Rise and Fall of Marijuana in America. Basic Books. December 5, 2017.
