= The Art of Cooking with Cannabis =

2021 cannabis cookbook by Tracey Medeiros

- Author: Tracey Medeiros
- Genre: Cannabis cookbook
- Publisher: Skyhorse Publishing
- Publication date: 2021
- Publication place: United States
- ISBN: 1510756051
- OCLC: 1255704545

The Art of Cooking with Cannabis: CBD and THC-Infused Recipes from Across America is a 2021 cannabis cookbook by Vermont author Tracey Medeiros, incorporating cannabis in regional American cuisines – Northeastern, Midwestern, Southern, and Western.

== Author ==
Medieros is a graduate of Johnson & Wales University in Providence, an institution known for its culinary arts and hospitality programs. This is her fifth cookbook.

== Synopsis ==
The book is arranged by geographical region, and includes profiles of the featured brands and chefs. One section is devoted to hemp as food, another to the compound CBD found in cannabis, and another to THC also found in the plant.

== Critical reception ==
A reviewer noted the author's use of terpene-focused recipes for flavor. Esquire said that it was "like a traditional cookbook your gran would keep on her bookshelf. A really cool gran", and identified it as one of the best 15 cookbooks of 2021.

The Los Angeles Times praised the book for showcasing a wide range of recipes, outside the usual "tired pot-brownie cliché".

== See also ==
- List of books about cannabis
