= Weed: The User's Guide =

2016 book by David Schmader

- Author: David Schmader
- Subject: Cannabis consumption
- Genre: Nonfiction
- Publisher: Sasquatch Books
- Publication date: April 2016
- ISBN: 978-1-63217-042-2 (Hardcover)
- OCLC: 940954318
- Website: Publisher's notes

Weed: The User's Guide: A 21st Century Handbook for Enjoying Marijuana is a 2016 book about cannabis by Seattle writer David Schmader. Schmader is also a writer for The Stranger, a Seattle alt weekly newspaper, where he writes a cannabis column as of August 2016. The book is in part a cannabis cookbook, containing an edibles recipe section.

== Critical reception ==
Critics of the book said it is "beautifully designed" and a "smartly written pot primer", but misses some information like quick decarboxylation of cannabis in a home oven. One critic said the book was "testament to the progress, triumph and privilege of legalized recreational marijuana in the author's state" of Washington.

== See also ==
- List of books about cannabis
