= Legal high =

Legal high may refer to:

- An alternative name, often a misnomer, for a designer drug
- Legal High (novel), a 2016 novel by German author Rainer Schmidt
- "Legal High", a song on the album Alive & Amplified by The Mooney Suzuki
- Legal High (Japanese TV series), a 2012 Japanese television series
  - Legal High (South Korean TV series), a 2019 South Korean television series
