= Marijuana Myths, Marijuana Facts: A Review of the Scientific Evidence =

1997 book

- Author: Lynn Zimmer and John P. Morgan
- Subject: Cannabis (drug) and U.S. drug control policy
- Genre: Non-fiction
- Publication date: 1997

Marijuana Myths, Marijuana Facts: A Review of the Scientific Evidence is a 1997 book about the medical effects of cannabis, and related U.S. drug control policy, written by Lynn Zimmer and John P. Morgan. As of 1998, Zimmer was a sociology professor at Queens College. Morgan was a professor of pharmacology at City University of New York Medical School when he wrote the book; he was on the National Organization for the Reform of Marijuana Laws (NORML) board of directors from 1996 until 2005 and "published approximately 100 articles, book chapters and books, largely focused on the clinical pharmacology of psychoactive drugs" by the time of his death in 2008.

== Content ==
Recognizing marijuana is here to stay, the book provides reliable information about marijuana's effects on people. The authors recognize that marijuana policies and personal decisions about marijuana use should be based on scientific evidence, factual information, and common sense. The review of claims about marijuana and the latest scientific evidence about marijuana's effects leads the authors to conclude that, while heavy marijuana use can be harmful, marijuana use, in general, is not nearly as harmful as the myths about marijuana claim. Despite the criminalization of marijuana in the United States and the massive efforts embodied by the war on drugs, more adolescents were trying marijuana in the 1990s. The myths covered include many individual medical, criminological or sociological claims that can be examined scientifically:

=== Medical ===
- Marijuana has no medical value (Note: Co-author John P. Morgan testified in 1988 before DEA administrative law judge Francis L. Young that "To pretend marijuana has no medical value, while arguing that a chemical in marijuana, THC, has medical use is nonsensical.")
- Marijuana is highly addictive
- Marijuana is a gateway drug
- Marijuana kills brain cells
- Marijuana causes amotivational syndrome
- Marijuana impairs memory and cognition
- Marijuana causes psychological impairment
- Marijuana interferes with male and female sex hormones
- Marijuana use during pregnancy damages the fetus
- Marijuana impairs the immune system
- Marijuana is more damaging to the lungs than tobacco
- Marijuana gets trapped in body fat
- Marijuana-related hospital emergencies are increasing

=== Criminological or sociological ===
- Marijuana offenses are not severely punished
- Marijuana policy in the Netherlands is a failure
- Marijuana causes crime
- Marijuana use before or while driving is a major cause of highway accidents
- Marijuana is more potent today than in the past
- Marijuana use can be prevented

== Reception ==
A review in the Journal of Psychoactive Drugs stated "There are many strongly held beliefs – here mostly exposed as myths – about marijuana, and such beliefs cover the gamut of scientific, clinical, psychological, social, criminological and other issues. The book's chapters thus address issues of marijuana's real or putative effects on sex hormones and reproduction, lungs, the immune system, the brain, memory, cognition and motivation; the gateway theory and addiction; crime, deviance and punishment, and so on -- in other words, virtually all the concerns that have been raised for decades in varying form... an issue-by-issue refutation of many of the positions often taken for granted by government, educational institutions, and even some professional organizations... the final chapter presents a whirlwind skeptic's tour through recent decades of governmental and public hysteria, misinformation and other follies..."

A review in the Journal of the American Medical Association stated "Zimmer and Morgan provide an extraordinarily well-researched and passionately argued book on the biomedical and sociological issues raised in today's debate about marijuana. In their desire to 'set the record straight', however, they sometimes sacrifice even-handedness for impact."

The Reason magazine obituary of co-author John P. Morgan M.D. stated that the book had "concisely and authoritatively debunked the major themes of anti-pot [cannabis] propaganda".

== See also ==
- List of books about cannabis
