= A New Leaf =

A New Leaf or New Leaf may refer to:

- Animal Crossing: New Leaf, a 2012 social simulation video game
- "A New Leaf" (short story), by F. Scott Fitzgerald
- A New Leaf (film), a 1971 film
- A New Leaf (TV series), a 2014 South Korean television series
- "New Leaf" (SpongeBob SquarePants), a 2006 episode of SpongeBob SquarePants
- New Leaf (Scheer), a 2007 public artwork by Lisa Scheer
- NewLeaf, a former Canadian virtual airline
- New Leaf Market, California-based health food stores bought by New Seasons Market
- A New Leaf (book), a 2014 non-fiction book about cannabis by Alyson Martin and Nushin Rashidian
