= Brave New Weed =

2016 Non-fiction book by Joe Dolce

Brave New Weed: Adventures into the Uncharted World of Cannabis
- First edition cover
- Author: Joe Dolce
- Subject: Cannabis, cannabis industry, and cannabis culture
- Genre: Nonfiction
- Publisher: HarperWave
- Publication date: October 4, 2016
- Publication place: United States
- Pages: 320
- ISBN: 978-0-06-249991-2
- OCLC: 972538627
- Website: Brave New Weed

Brave New Weed: Adventures into the Uncharted World of Cannabis is a 2016 American and nonfiction book by writer and former-magazine editor Joe Dolce. The book is about cannabis, the cannabis industry, and cannabis culture around the world, during the period of cannabis legalization in the United States.

Dolce was inspired to write the book after being treated with medical cannabis for chronic pain. The experience led him to become a cannabis educator and advocate.

== Reception ==
Matt Taibbi of The New York Times wrote it was a "hitchhiker's guide" to "huge new industry surrounding the care, consumption and enjoyment of weed." Taibbi praised the book for addressing racial inequalities concerning how drug users are treated by authorities in the United States.

Kirkus Reviews said it was "best taken with a certain amount of skepticism" but "it offers an entertaining and informative overview of the latest changes in cannabis production and consumption."

In 2019, Rolling Stone ranked it number seven on a top-eight list of books about cannabis, calling it a "well-researched book [that] drills down on the social, historical, and cultural aspects" of cannabis.

In 2020, Forbes included the book on the list, "The Best Weed Reads To Build Your Cannabis Library."

== See also ==
- List of books about cannabis
