= The Official High Times Cannabis Cookbook =

2020 non-fiction book by Doug Fine

- First edition
- Author: Elise McDonough
- Subject: Cannabis cookbook
- Genre: Nonfiction
- Publisher: Chronicle Books
- Publication date: March 1, 2012
- Publication place: United States
- Pages: 160
- ISBN: 1452101337
- OCLC: 1001883241

The Official High Times Cannabis Cookbook is a cannabis cookbook published in 2012 by Chronicle Books. The author, Elise McDonough, was art director at High Times magazine and the recipes were published in the magazine's recipe column.

== Critical reception ==
Publishers Weekly praised the chapter on holiday cooking with cannabis, saying the THC turkey injected with a "magic marinade" "could mellow out the harshest of family Thanksgivings". LA Weekly said it was "the first pot cookbook we've seen that reads like a modern cookbook". Vice and a Jewish food website noted the THC-infused latkes recipe in the book.

Academic Marion Nestle stated in 2021 at foodpolitics.com that she was surprised to see that there was "an entire cookbook genre" concerning cannabis, of which McDonough's book was her exmplar.

== See also ==
- List of books about cannabis
