= Smoke and Mirrors: The War on Drugs and the Politics of Failure =

1996 book by Dan Baum

- Author: Dan Baum
- Subject: United States drug policy
- Genre: Non-fiction
- Publisher: Little, Brown and Company
- Publication place: United States
- Pages: 396
- ISBN: 978-0-316-08412-3

Smoke and Mirrors: The War on Drugs and the Politics of Failure is a 1996 book by journalist Dan Baum, a Wall Street Journal reporter. Among the topics considered are the perception of a national "drug problem" involving cannabis, leveraged by the Nixon Administration to launch the war on drugs, and later administrations' preoccupation with the phenomenon of the crack baby while failing to address other urgent prenatal health needs.

== Reception ==
A New York Times review called the book a "devastating" critique of the war on drugs with "dozens of horror stories...illustrat[ing] the legal excesses to which the war on drugs waged by Washington over the past quarter-century has committed this country". A Los Angeles Times review said Baum shows how it "has been costly not only in national treasure–an estimated $120 billion spent during the Bush years alone–but also in the violence done to our courts, our cities and our civil liberties. And we have little to show for it." The Washington Post said it showed "Federal drug warriors continue to use pot [cannabis]-inflated statistics to leverage ever-greater sums of money in futile efforts to curb drug abuse through punishment" and resultant "all-out assault on constitutional protections against search and seizure, massive and indiscriminate incarceration and a disproportionate and ultimately embarrassing vendetta against young, black males."

== See also ==
- List of books about cannabis
