= Pot Planet =

2002 non-fiction book by Brian Preston

Pot Planet: Adventures in Global Marijuana Culture
- Author: Brian Preston
- Language: English
- Subject: Cannabis, cannabis tourism, drug policy
- Genre: Nonfiction
- Publisher: Grove Press
- Publication date: May 22, 2002
- Pages: 304
- ISBN: 0802138977 Hardcover, 1st ed.
- OCLC: 937631687
- Website: groveatlantic.com/book/pot-planet/

Pot Planet: Adventures in Global Marijuana Culture is a 2002 non-fiction book about cannabis, cannabis tourism, and drug policy by Canadian author Brian Preston.

It sold 30,000 copies in England, and was translated into Spanish, Hungarian, and Japanese.

== Critical reception ==
Publishers Weekly said in their review, "for those who share an affinity with Preston's subject, this excellent book will be devoured like a tray of brownies". The Globe and Mail described it as a travelogue in which the author set out to "toke his way through 12 countries, sampling the local grass and hash" but "when he gets down to business, he writes an engaging and informative book" as the author sees and describes "meeting so many people ... who had been persecuted and jailed" because of "American drug-war fundamentalism that drives the statist cause" of prohibition. Kirkus Reviews likewise found it to be "a blend of advocacy and (so to speak) sober reportage" that exposed the "taxpayer-financed, cannabis-focused atrocity of the drug war". The Vancouver Sun called it "an excellent snapshot of global pot culture, laced with solid reporting and some genuinely nutty writing", and "a "surprisingly lucid" account of his journey, and pro-legalization polemic".

== Translations ==
- Preston, Brian (2002) [2002]. Fűbolygó : kalandozások a világ marihuánakultúrájában (in Hungarian). Kőrös László (trans.). Budapest (Hungary): Cartaphilus. ISBN 978-963-266-038-7. OCLC 909145012.
- Preston, Brian (2003) [2002]. Planeta marihuana : una aventura por la cultura global del cannabis (in Spanish). Daniel Menezo (trans.). Barcelona: RBA. ISBN 8479019964. OCLC 733672050.
- Preston, Brian (2003) [2002]. ポット・プラネット = Pot planet : マリワナ・カルチャーをめぐる冒険 / [Potto puranetto = Pot planet : Mariwana karuchā o meguru bōken] (in Japanese). Ken'ichi Yamakawa (trans.). Tokyo: Oota Shuppan. ISBN 4872337972. OCLC 675071671.

== See also ==
- List of books about cannabis
