= Grass Roots (Emily Dufton) =

2017 non-fiction book by Emily Dufton

Grass Roots: The Rise and Fall of Marijuana in America
- Author: Emily Dufton
- Subject: Legalization of cannabis; United States drug policy; United States history
- Publisher: Basic Books
- Publication date: December 5, 2017
- Website: emilydufton.com/grass-roots

Grass Roots: The Rise and Fall of Marijuana in America is a 2017 non-fiction book by Emily Dufton, based on her doctoral research.

== Reviews ==
An academic review called it "a fresh approach to understanding the drug wars by giving equal consideration to both anti-pot groups and activists working to decriminalize the use of marijuana".

Kirkus Reviews called it "a comprehensive history of marijuana legalization in America".
