= List of cannabis columns =

Several periodicals carry columns on cannabis.

- "Philly420", The Philadelphia Inquirer, begun by Chris Goldstein in 2012
- "The Cannabist", The Denver Post, begun by Ricardo Baca in 2013
- Julie Weed blog, Forbes, started 2015 by Julie Weed
- Erica Freeman column, The Coloradoan, begun in 2015
- "Clean Your Bong", The Stranger (Seattle), begun by David Schmader in 2016
- "Stash Box", Seattle Weekly, started 2016, Meagan Angus
- "Green State", San Francisco Chronicle, begun by David Downs in 2017
- "High Time", The Guardian (UK), begun by Alex Halperin in 2018
- "High Country", The Aspen Times, begun by Katie Shapiro in 2018
- "Cannabis Corner", Boulder Weekly

In addition, many major newspapers and news outlets have online sections or indexes devoted to cannabis, such as The Associated Press, Deutsche Welle, ABC News, NBC News ["legal pot"], NPR ["legalization of marijuana"], Los Angeles Times ["The Rolling Paper"], The New York Times ["marijuana and medial marijuana"], The Seattle Times, The Denver Post, Las Vegas Review-Journal ["pot news"], and American Banker ["Marijuana banking"].

== See also ==
- List of books about cannabis
