= Hitchhiker's Guide (disambiguation) =

Hitchhiker's Guide usually refers to The Hitchhiker's Guide to the Galaxy, Douglas Adams' science fiction comedy franchise, partly inspired by the European guidebook.

Hitchhiker's Guide may also refer to:

- Hitch-hiker's Guide to Europe, a travel guide

== See also ==
- The Hitchhiker's Guide to the Galaxy (disambiguation)
