= Weed Land =

2014 non-fiction book by Peter Hecht

Weed Land: Inside America's Marijuana Epicenter and How Pot Went Legit
- First edition
- Author: Peter Hecht
- Language: English
- Subject: Cannabis
- Publisher: University of California Press
- Publication date: March 2014; 12 years ago
- Publication place: United States

Weed Land: Inside America's Marijuana Epicenter and How Pot Went Legit is a non-fiction book about cannabis by Peter Hecht, published by University of California Press in March 2014. The book's first chapter covers the Drug Enforcement Administration's raid of the Wo/Men's Alliance for Medical Marijuana in Santa Cruz, California.

== See also ==
- List of books about cannabis
