= Richard Miller (author) =

American historian and author

Richard Lawrence Miller (born 1949) is an American historian and author from the state of Missouri. He has written a multi-volume biography of U.S. President Abraham Lincoln, and in Journal of American History, another scholar said of the work "an independent scholar, Miller does not offer bold reinterpretations, but he is an indefatigable researcher".

Miller has also written drug reference works including The Encyclopedia of Addictive Drugs, "a remarkably clear and informative work intended for a wide audience" including law enforcement users, and criticism of U.S. drug policy and treatment methods. He has advocated for the complete legalization of all drugs, stating in The Case for Legalizing Drugs (1991) that drug users lived "quite happily" in America prior to the passage of the Harrison Act in 1914. Miller appeared in the 2012 documentary The House I Live In about the U.S. war on drugs.

His criticism of the medical ethics of Straight, Incorporated was reviewed by the Alcohol and Drugs History Society.

== Drug Warriors and Their Prey ==
This book analyzes the drug war in the United States by considering physiological, social, and economic effects of drug use and constitutional dimensions and the effectiveness of drug law enforcement efforts. The book uses a case study approach to examine the effects of drug use on society. Examples are provided of how drug law enforcement efforts have gotten out of control because such efforts sometimes violate constitutional rights and generate undue fear among citizens. The author contends an "imaginary" drug crisis has been manufactured, one that sacrifices constitutional rights under the guise of drug control. Showing how the drug war fits into a socially destructive process, the author calls for an end to the drug war before it destroys society further. He describes a chain of destruction in terms of five links – identification, ostracism, confiscation, concentration, and annihilation. In this chain of destruction, drug users are portrayed as victims and scapegoats at the hands of authoritarians.

A review in The Booklist stated:

Using chain-of-destruction analysis based on Raul Hilberg's The Destruction of the European Jews (1961), Miller argues that the drug war has moved from identification through ostracism and confiscation and that concentration and annihilation are currently "in 'prototype' stage." Before readers conclude that Miller's belief that "the war on drug users masks a war on democracy" is extreme, they may wish to consider the disturbing evidence he amasses. A powerful, passionate argument that the war on drugs serves only authoritarians' interests.

— Mary Carroll, Booklist

A review in Library Journal stated:

[Miller] continues the argument he began in The Case for Legalizing Drugs. Drawing on his latest book, Nazi Justiz, he makes an extended analogy between Germany repressing the Jews and America repressing drug users. In chapters on identification, ostracism, confiscation, concentration, and annihilation, he shows that democracy, privacy, and family life can be lost in our society just as they were when these policies were applied to the Jews. Because of "bureaucratic thrust," the criminalization aimed at one group consumes the entire society.

— Janice Dunham, Library Journal

Another review published by the Drug Reform Coordination Network stated:

[The book is] a point by point comparison of the reality of Drug Prohibition in the United States today with exactly analogous situations leading up to Hitler's Third Reich and the attempted destruction of the Jewish people ... certain to repulse the very readers who need most to understand that, indeed, it can happen again ... there really is no alternative but the kind of stark simplicity of theme which Drug Warriors epitomizes.

— Peter Webster

== Bibliography ==
Books

- Heritage of Fear: Illusion and Reality in the Cold War (1988)
- The Case for Legalizing Drugs (1991)
- Drug Warriors and Their Prey: From Police Power to Police State (1996)
- Nazi Justiz: Law of the Holocaust (1995)
- Truman: The Rise to Power (1985)
- Whittaker: Struggles of a Supreme Court Justice (2002)
- The Encyclopedia of Addictive Drugs (2002)
- Lincoln and His World: The Early Years (2006)
- Lincoln and His World: Prairie Politician, 1834-1842 (2008)
- Lincoln and His World: Volume 3, The Rise to National Prominence, 1843–1853 (2011)
- Lincoln and His World: Volume 4, the Path to the Presidency, 1854–1860 (2012)
- Money in American Politics: The First 200 Years (2021)

Other works

- "Teens and Marijuana; Ethics of Research", 1991
