= Craft Weed =

2018 book about cannabis production

Craft Weed: Family Farming and the Future of the Marijuana Industry
- Author: Ryan Stoa
- Genre: Nonfiction
- Publisher: MIT Press
- Publication date: 2018
- ISBN: 9780262038867

Craft Weed: Family Farming and the Future of the Marijuana Industry is a 2018 MIT Press book by Ryan Stoa. In it, he argues for an American cannabis industry that looks more like the craft beer industry, and less like "Big Marijuana" equivalent of Anheuser-Busch. The author is an associate professor of law at Concordia University School of Law in Boise, Idaho.

== Reception ==
A review in The Times Literary Supplement said the book author's "expertise is undeniable" but "some of his deeper trawls through legislature slow an otherwise intriguing narrative". Another review found merit in Stoa's advocacy for agricultural law reform around craft cannabis, to include an appellation system for cannabis parallel to that of the American Viticultural Areas (AVAs).

== See also ==
- List of books about cannabis
