= Pacific Northwest Quarterly =

- Discipline: History
- Language: English
- Edited by: Bruce Hevly

Publication details
- History: 1906-current
- Publisher: Center for the Study of the Pacific Northwest, University of Washington (United States)
- Frequency: Quarterly

Standard abbreviations
- ISO 4: Pac. Northwest Q.

Indexing
- ISSN: 0030-8803
- JSTOR: pacnorwestq
- OCLC no.: 2392232

Links
- Journal homepage

Pacific Northwest Quarterly (commonly referred to as PNQ) is a peer-reviewed academic journal of history that publishes scholarship relating to the Pacific Northwest of the United States, including Alaska, and adjacent areas of western Canada. Founded in 1906 by Edmond S. Meany as the Washington Historical Quarterly, the journal is published by the University of Washington. Editorial offices are located in the UW Department of History. By tradition, the managing editor is a professor in the department. The current managing editor is Bruce Hevly.

== Editors of the Quarterly ==
- Edmond S. Meany 1906–1935
- Merrill Jensen 1936–1942
- Charles M. Gates 1943–1963
- Robert E. Burke 1963–1986
- Lewis O. Saum 1986–1991
- John M. Findlay 1991–2003, 2008–2016
- W.J. Rorabaugh 2003–2008
- Bruce Hevly 2016–Present
