= Marihuana Reconsidered =

1971 book by Lester Grinspoon

- Author: Lester Grinspoon
- Language: English
- Genre: Non-fiction
- Published: 1971 (Harvard University Press)
- Publication place: United States
- ISBN: 978-0674548350

Marihuana Reconsidered is a 1971 book by Lester Grinspoon about the effects of marijuana and its place in society, first published by Harvard University Press.

The book has received reviews from publications including Kirkus Reviews, JAMA, Clinical Pharmacology & Therapeutics, The New England Journal of Medicine, and The New York Times.

== See also ==
- List of books about cannabis
