= Marijuana Nation =

2014 book by Roger Roffman

- Author: Roger Roffman
- Subject: Cannabis legalization in Washington State
- Publisher: Pegasus (Norton, dist.)
- Publication date: April 20, 2014
- Publication place: United States
- Pages: 352
- ISBN: 9781605985466
- Website: pegasusbooks.com/books/marijuana-nation-9781605985466-hardcover

Marijuana Nation is a 2014 book by University of Washington professor Roger Roffman. The book describes his involvement as an Army officer in the Vietnam War, and later as a NORML member leading Washington State legislation, the Marijuana Education and Control Act of 1977 (House Bill 257). The act would have decriminalized cannabis in the state 35 years before the eventual passage of Washington Initiative 502 (I-502). The legislation passed 52 to 43 in the Washington State House in April 1977, but died in the state Senate.

Roffman was a sponsor of I-502, which was approved by voters in November 2012, making Washington and Colorado the first states in the United States to legalize marijuana.

== See also ==
- List of books about cannabis
