= The House I Live In (2012 film) =

2012 documentary film

- Directed by: Eugene Jarecki
- Written by: Eugene Jarecki
- Produced by: Eugene Jarecki; Melinda Shopsin
- Starring: Nannie Jeter; David Simon
- Cinematography: Sam Cullman; Derek Hallquist
- Edited by: Paul Frost
- Music by: Robert Miller
- Distributed by: Abramorama
- Release date: October 5, 2012
- Running time: 108 minutes
- Countries: United States; International
- Language: English

The House I Live In, directed by Eugene Jarecki, is a 2012 documentary film about the war on drugs in the United States.

== Participants ==
- Michelle Alexander (civil rights litigator and the author of 2010's The New Jim Crow)
- Shanequa Benitez (resident of Cromwell Towers housing project in Yonkers, New York)
- The Honorable Mark W. Bennett (U.S. District Court Judge in Sioux City, Iowa)
- Charles Bowden (journalist covering drug war-caused violence on the Mexico–U.S. border)
- Mike Carpenter (Chief of Security at Joseph Harp Correctional Center in Lexington, Oklahoma)
- Marshal Larry Cearley (Police Officer in the village of Magdalena, New Mexico)
- Eric Franklin (Warden of the Lexington Corrections Center in Lexington, Oklahoma)
- Maurice Haltiwanger (sentenced to 20 years for crack cocaine distribution)
- Dr. Carl Hart (Professor of Clinical Neuroscience, Columbia University)
- Nannie Jeter (resident of New Haven, Connecticut)
- Anthony Johnson (former small-time drug dealer in Yonkers, New York)
- Dr. Gabor Maté (Hungarian-born physician specializing in the treatment of addiction - has been working in Vancouver, British Columbia, Canada for several decades)
- Mark Mauer (Director, The Sentencing Project)
- Richard Lawrence Miller (American historian and expert on the history of U.S. drug laws)
- Charles Ogletree (Jesse Climenko Professor of Law at Harvard Law School, and a former academic advisor to Barack and Michelle Obama)
- Kevin Ott (formerly serving life without parole on drug charges, Lexington Correctional Center, Lexington, Oklahoma)
- Susan Randall (Private investigator in Vermont - formerly a journalist/producer for National Public Radio, All Things Considered, Morning Edition, Vermont Public Radio, and a researcher and associate producer for the A&E series Biography)
- David Simon (creator of The Wire on HBO)
- Julie Stewart (President and founder of Families Against Mandatory Minimums aka FAMM)
- Dennis Whidbee (former drug dealer, and the father of Anthony Johnson)
- Officer Fabio Zuena (Police Officer in the city of Providence, Rhode Island)
- David Kennedy (Professor of Criminal Justice, John Jay College of Criminal Justice in New York City)

== Reception ==
The documentary has been well received. Among the review aggregators, Rotten Tomatoes gave it 94% based on 56 reviews and Metacritic gave it 77/100 based on 24 reviews. Roger Ebert says The House I Live In "makes a shattering case against the War on Drugs." Peter Bradshaw reviewed the film for The Guardian and summed it up as an "angry and personal attack on America's war on drugs [that] contends it is a grotesquely wasteful public-works scheme".

== Awards ==
- January 2012: Won the Grand Jury Prize: Documentary at the Sundance Film Festival.
- April 2014: Won a Peabody Award.

== See also ==
- List of American films of 2012
- Prison–industrial complex

Awards
Preceded by How to Die in Oregon	Sundance Grand Jury Prize: U.S. Documentary; 2012	Succeeded by Blood Brother
