= Commodifying Cannabis =

2018 book by Bradley J. Borougerdi

- Author: Bradley J. Borougerdi
- Subject: Ethnobotany, Cannabis industry
- Genre: Nonfiction
- Published: 2018
- Publisher: Lexington Books
- Pages: 185
- ISBN: 9781498586375
- OCLC: 1048950003
- Website: rowman.com/ISBN/9781498586399/Commodifying-Cannabis-A-Cultural-History-of-a-Complex-Plant-in-the-Atlantic-World

Commodifying Cannabis: A Cultural History of a Complex Plant in the Atlantic World is a 2018 nonfiction book by Bradley J. Borougerdi about the historical and present commodification of Cannabis by society and the industry. It examines in particular "the connection between ancient uses of cannabis and our more recent social and cultural contexts" in the Anglo-American Atlantic world, and "the trajectory of cannabis commodification in the early modern period, the prohibition of cannabis in the nineteenth century, and the recent re-commodification of cannabis". The book, incorporating three centuries of source material, is based on the author's PhD dissertation "Cord of Empire, Exotic Intoxicant: Hemp and Culture in the Atlantic World, 1600–1900". Borougerdi received his degree from University of Texas at Arlington Department of History, advised by Christopher Morris.

== Reception ==
The book is one of six books selected in Florida Gulf Coast University's cannabis industry research guide, and one of four business books in the cannabis research guide, "Recommended sources to research the business of cannabis" at the University of Washington Libraries.

A review published by the Alcohol and Drugs History Society and the American Institute of the History of Pharmacy said the book provides valuable insight about the importance of "global knowledge flows to our understanding of cultural commodities", a view echoed in the book Taming Cannabis that cites Commodifying Cannabis as "shed[ding] additional light on this vital role played by hemp within the competition of Great Powers in early modern Europe" and in understanding the European colonization of North Africa.

A review in the Journal of American History calls the book "a sophisticated and welcome addition to the growing body of scholarship on marijuana".
