= W. J. Rorabaugh =

American historian (1945–2020)

- Born: William Joseph Rorabaugh; 1945
- Died: 2020 (aged 74–75)

Academic background
- Education: Stanford University, University of California, Berkeley

Academic work
- Discipline: History
- Institutions: University of Washington

William Joseph Rorabaugh (1945–2020) was an American historian. He was a professor of history at the University of Washington, and from 2003 to 2008 he was the managing editor of Pacific Northwest Quarterly.

== Life ==
He graduated from Stanford University and the University of California, Berkeley, with a PhD in 1976. He was a book reviewer and the author of several works of American history. In July 2006 he became president of the Alcohol and Drugs History Society.

He has studied the history of beer in America. Rorabaugh's 1979 book The Alcoholic Republic: An American Tradition demonstrated the exceedingly high rate of alcohol consumption in the United States in the early nineteenth century. At the time, Rorabaugh argued, "Americans preferred cider and whiskey because those drinks contained more alcohol than beer, which was too weak for American taste... One can only conclude that at the root of the alcoholic republic was the fact that Americans chose the most highly alcoholic beverages that they could obtain easily and cheaply."

In his more recent work on the decade of the 1960s in American history, Rorabaugh has suggested a redefinition of "the sixties." In his 2002 book Kennedy and the Promise of the Sixties, he wrote: "It is possible to argue that the sixties did not begin until 1965, when African Americans rioted in Watts and when large numbers of American combat troops were sent to Vietnam, and did not end until 1974 when Richard Nixon resigned, or even 1975, when the North Vietnamese marched into Saigon." Rorabaugh identified the earlier half of the decade as distinct both from the 1950s and "the sixties": "The early sixties, then, is important because it was an in-between time, a short space lodged between a more conservative, cautious, and complacent era that preceded it and a more frenzied, often raucous, and even violent era that followed."

== Publications ==
- W. J. Rorabaugh (1981). The Alcoholic Republic: An American Tradition. New York: Oxford University Press. ISBN 978-0-19-502990-1. [A study of American alcohol consumption in the Early Republic.]
- W. J. Rorabaugh (1988). The Craft Apprentice: From Franklin to the Machine Age in America. New York: Oxford University Press. ISBN 978-0-19-505189-6.
- W. J. Rorabaugh (1989). Berkeley at War: The 1960s. New York: Oxford University Press. ISBN 978-0-19-506667-8. [A study of the unrest on the Berkeley campus of the University of California during the era of the Free Speech Movement.]
- W. J. Rorabaugh; Donald T. Critchlow (1994). America! A Concise History. Belmont, CA: Wadsworth Publishing Company. ISBN 978-0-534-13614-7.
- W. J. Rorabaugh. (2002). Kennedy and the Promise of the Sixties. New York: Cambridge University Press. ISBN 978-0-521-81617-5.
- W. J. Rorabaugh; Donald T. Critchlow; Paula C. Baker (2004). America's Promise: A Concise History of the United States. Lanham, Maryland: Rowman & Littlefield. ISBN 978-0-7425-1189-7.
- W. J. Rorabaugh (2009). The Real Making of the President: Kennedy, Nixon, and the 1960 Election. Lawrence: University Press of Kansas. ISBN 978-0-7006-1639-8.
- Donald T. Critchlow; W. J. Rorabaugh (2012). Takeover: How the Left's Quest for Social Justice Corrupted Liberalism. Wilmington, Delaware: ISI Books. ISBN 978-1-6101-7059-8.
- W. J. Rorabaugh (2015). American Hippies. New York: Cambridge University Press. ISBN 978-1-107-04923-9.
- W. J. Rorabaugh (2018). Prohibition: A Concise History. New York: Oxford University Press. ISBN 978-0-19-068993-3.
