= Thai Stick =

2013 book by Peter H. Maguire

- Author: Peter H. Maguire
- Publisher: Columbia University Press
- Publication date: 2013
- ISBN: 9780231161350

Thai Stick – Surfers, Scammers and the Untold Story of the Marijuana Trade is a 2013 book by Peter H. Maguire about the illicit cannabis trade in Southeast Asia. The book was published by Columbia University Press, and in 2015, it was optioned by surfing competitor Kelly Slater to become a documentary film and television series.

== See also ==
- List of books about cannabis
