= A New Leaf (book) =

2014 non-fiction book about cannabis

A New Leaf: The End of Cannabis Prohibition
- First edition
- Author: Alyson Martin; Nushin Rashidian
- Language: English
- Subject: Cannabis
- Published: 2014
- Publisher: The New Press

A New Leaf: The End of Cannabis Prohibition is a non-fiction book about cannabis by investigative journalists Alyson Martin and Nushin Rashidian, published by The New Press in 2014.

== See also ==
- List of books about cannabis
