= Tracey Medeiros =

American chef and cookbook author

- Born: New Bedford, Massachusetts, US
- Education: Northeastern University; Johnson and Wales University
- Known for: Cookbook writing
- Notable work: The Art of Cooking with Cannabis; The Vermont Farm Table Cookbook
- Website: Official website

Tracey Medeiros is an American chef and cookbook author. She wrote The Art of Cooking with Cannabis as well as several cookbooks that collect recipes from farmers and local businesses in Vermont, and co-authored a similar collection from Connecticut.

== Early life and education ==
Tracey Medeiros was born to Sheridan and Eugene Medeiros in New Bedford and lived in Freetown, Massachusetts for a number of years. She graduated from Apponequet High School. She has a bachelor's degree in political science from Northeastern University, a paralegal diploma from New York University and a diploma in Culinary Arts from Johnson and Wales University.

== Career ==
Her first book, Dishing Up Vermont (2008), features recipes from contributors throughout Vermont, including farmers and restaurateurs. Medeiros began writing The Vermont Farm Table Cookbook in 2011, while writing a column for The Essex Reporter and Colchester Sun, and employed two recipe testers to assist with the collection of recipes from Vermont farmers, bakeries, and restaurants. She also collected Vermont recipes in her 2017 cookbook The Vermont Non-GMO Cookbook. For the 2015 book The Connecticut Farm Table Cookbook, Medeiros worked with co-author Christy Colasurdo to collect recipes from Connecticut farmers and chefs. Medeiros collected recipes from 45 contributors across the United States to create her 2021 book The Art of Cooking with Cannabis: CBD and THC-Infused Recipes from Across America. The Los Angeles Times praised the book for showcasing a wide range of recipes, outside the usual "tired pot-brownie cliché".

Medeiros also wrote the column "The Farmhouse Kitchen: A Guide To Eating Local" for Edible Green Mountains magazine, and has contributed to Salon. She has also worked as a guest cooking instructor in the Northeast region.

== Books ==
- The Art of Cooking with Cannabis (Skyhorse Publishing, 2021) ISBN 978-1510756052
- The Vermont Non-GMO Cookbook (Skyhorse Publishing, 2017) ISBN 978-1510722729
- with Christy Colasurdo The Connecticut Farm Table Cookbook (Countryman Press, 2015) ISBN 978-1581572568
- The Vermont Farm Table Cookbook (Countryman Press, 2013) ISBN 978-1581571660
- Dishing Up Vermont (Storey Publishing, 2008) ISBN 978-1603420259

== Personal life ==
Medeiros is a resident of the state of Vermont, where she lives with her husband, who is an artist and a commercial airline pilot, and their son.
