= Pot in Pans =

2019 cannabis history book

Pot in Pans: A History of Eating Cannabis
- Author: Robyn Griggs Lawrence
- Published: 2019
- Publisher: Lanham, Rowman & Littlefield
- Pages: 217
- ISBN: 978-1-5381-0697-6
- OCLC: 1055685869

Pot in Pans: A History of Eating Cannabis is a 2019 book about cannabis edibles. The Aspen Times said it was "the first published book to trace the comprehensive timeline of cannabis cookery to its roots".

The author Robyn Griggs Lawrence was editor-in-chief of Natural Home & Garden magazine. A scholarly review in the journal Food, Culture & Society said as a social history of cannabis consumption, it "extensively documents" the subject.
