= Marihuana: The First Twelve Thousand Years =

Non-fiction book by Ernest Lawrence Abel

- Author: Ernest Lawrence Abel
- Subject: Cannabis
- Genre: Non-fiction
- Publisher: Springer
- Publication date: 1980
- Pages: 292

Marihuana: The First Twelve Thousand Years is a book by Ernest Lawrence Abel about the history of cannabis, first published in 1980.

== Table of contents ==
- Cannabis in the Ancient World
- Hashish and the Arabs
- Rope and Riches
- Cannabis Comes to the New World
- New Uses for the Old Hemp Plant
- The Indian Hemp Drug Debate
- The African Dagga Cultures
- The Hashish Club
- Hashish in America
- America's Drug Users
- Reefer Racism
- The Jazz Era
- Outlawing Marihuana

== Reception ==
The book received reviews from publications including Endeavour, The Quarterly Review of Biology, Annals of Internal Medicine, The Annals of the American Academy of Political and Social Science, Journal of Psychoactive Drugs, Journal of Ethnopharmacology, and The Public Historian.

== See also ==
- List of books about cannabis
