= The Hitchhiker's Guide to the Galaxy (disambiguation) =

The Hitchhiker's Guide to the Galaxy is a science fiction comedy series created by Douglas Adams.

The Hitchhiker's Guide to the Galaxy may also refer to:

- The Hitchhiker's Guide to the Galaxy (radio series), a 1978 radio series
  - The Hitchhiker's Guide to the Galaxy Primary and Secondary Phases, the first two series of the radio series by Douglas Adams
  - The Hitchhiker's Guide to the Galaxy Tertiary to Hexagonal Phases, the third, fourth, fifth, and sixth series of the radio series, adapted from Adams' remaining novels by Dirk Maggs
- The Hitchhiker's Guide to the Galaxy (novel), a 1979 novel
- The Hitchhiker's Guide to the Galaxy (TV series), a 1981 BBC TV series
- The Hitchhiker's Guide to the Galaxy (video game), a 1984 text-based computer game by Infocom
- The Hitchhiker's Guide to the Galaxy (film), a 2005 film by Garth Jennings
- The Hitchhiker's Guide to the Galaxy: The Original Radio Scripts a book, published in 1985
- "The Hitchhiker's Guide to the Galaxy", a 2024 song by South Korean group Artms
- The Hitchhiker's Guide to the Galaxy (fictional), the book as it appears in the franchise

== See also ==
- H2g2, a British-based collaborative online encyclopedia project founded by Douglas Adams in 1999
