= Legal High (novel) =

2016 novel by Rainer Schmidt

- First edition
- Author: Rainer Schmidt
- Language: German
- Publisher: Rowohlt Berlin
- Publication date: 2016
- Publication place: Germany
- Pages: 350
- ISBN: 978-3-87134-173-1
- OCLC: 958394277
- Preceded by: Cannabis GmbH

Legal High is a 2016 novel by German author Rainer Schmidt; a social satire about a near-future Germany where legalization of cannabis is imminent. The author is also a journalist (as of 2016 editor in chief of Frankfurter Allgemeine Zeitung's cultural magazine Frankfurter Allgemeine Quarterly). The novel's protagonist, der Dude, is based on a German cannabis grower with whom Schmidt became acquainted while doing journalistic research.

== Reception ==
Critics called the book a parody of political and economic strategies in Doppelmoral in den Hinterzimmern der Macht ("hypocrisy in the backrooms of power"), asking questions about the winners and losers of the "U-turn" on cannabis. A German business magazine included it in a review of several books about cannabis legalization, noting its clever examination of the schwerwiegende Auswirkungen (serious impacts) on regions that have already implemented it, such as the U.S. state of Colorado. The novel was referred to in a pro-legalization op-ed in Die Welt newspaper by German politician Cem Özdemir (at the time co-chair of the Alliance 90/The Greens party).

== See also ==
- German cannabis control bill, 2024 national legalization
- List of books about cannabis
