= David Schmader =

American writer

David Schmader is an American writer known for his solo plays, his writing for the Seattle newsweekly The Stranger, and his annotated screenings of Paul Verhoeven's Showgirls. He is the author of the 2016 book Weed: The User's Guide and the 2023 book Filmlandia!.

== Theater work ==
Schmader, a solo performer, has created works under the direction of Dan Savage, Chay Yew, and Matthew Richter, with productions at Seattle's Hugo House literary center and Bumbershoot Arts Festival, San Francisco's Theatre Rhinoceros, New York CIty's Dixon Place, and the Wexner Center for the Arts. Outside of full solo productions, Schmader has performed at Seattle's On the Boards and as a guest of the feminist art-and-performance collective Sister Spit.

== Key works ==
=== Letter to Axl ===
In 1993, Schmader authored the play Letter to Axl, in which he "uses his autobiographical stories and his obsession with the notoriously homophobic, misogynistic, chemically dependent rock star Axl Rose as a way of examining homophobia, masculinity, and the scary power of the mass media to inspire unrequited love in millions of people."

=== Straight ===
In his 1999 solo play Straight, Schmader "takes an undercover excursion into the world of sexual reprogramming...that utilizes Christian fundamentalist ideas in attempt to curb homosexual desires." In 2002, Straight was turned into a performance film which screened at film festivals in Seattle, Austin, Minneapolis, and Washington, D.C.

=== A Short-Term Solution to a Long-Term Problem ===
Schmader wrote his third solo play in 2011. A Short-Term Solution to a Long-Term Problem, which Schmader also performed, is "a comedy about unfunny things: children who die, adults who get sick, and the intricate damage religion can inflict on young people."

== Published work ==
=== The Stranger ===
From 1998 through 2014, Schmader served as a writer and editor at the Seattle alternative newsweekly The Stranger, writing the column "Last Days: The Week in Review." Schmader also wrote investigative essays on the Michael Jackson 2005 criminal trial and the AVN Awards in Las Vegas. With cartoonist Ellen Forney, Schmader created the five-part series "What the Drugs Taught Me," which was reprinted in Forney's 2007 collection I Love Led Zeppelin. Between 2002 and 2004, Schmader curated and hosted Pizzazz!, a citywide talent show produced by The Stranger and presented on opening night of the Bumbershoot Arts Festival. Schmader writes a cannabis column for The Stranger as of August 2016.

=== Showgirls annotation ===
In 1999, Schmader began hosting screenings of Paul Verhoeven's film Showgirls, touring his annotated screenings to film festivals and supplying the commentary track for the special-edition Showgirls DVD A Seattle Times reviewer called it "improbably wonderful...eviscerating commentary" and " "a beloved national phenomenon".

=== Weed: The Users Guide ===
Following the decriminalization of recreational marijuana in Washington State, Schmader wrote Weed: The User's Guide, "an encyclopedia of marijuana history, use, and culture," described by New York Botanical Garden as "a wonderful cultural history." Weed was published in 2016 by Sasquatch Books, with subsequent publications in the United Kingdom, Australia, and the Netherlands.

=== Filmlandia! ===
Subtitled "A Movie Lover's Guide to the Films and Television of Seattle, Portland, and the Great Northwest," Filmlandia! is Schmader's book surveying over 200 feature films shot and set in Oregon and Washington State, published in 2023 by Sasquatch Books.

== Critical reception ==
Schmader's plays have received positive reviews from mostly local outlets, including The Stranger, Seattle Weekly, and Seattlest. Seattle Weekly called 1999's Straight "brilliant" and "a compassionate, funny, but ardently intelligent exploration of the basic concepts of gender identity." Reviewing 2011's A Short-Term Solution to a Long-Term Problem, The Stranger wrote: "[Schmader's] protean wit, his willingness to stare without blinking into howlingly painful emotional cyclones, and his unfailingly calibrated ethical compass are three virtues every writer should strive to emulate."

Some of Schmader's works have gained recognition nationally, most notably his Showgirls annotation. In its review of Schmader's annotation, The Onion's A.V. Club stated: "Schmader provides a running commentary on and a deep understanding of these movies' multiple failures—giving them a second, legitimately entertaining life."

== Personal life ==
Schmader was born in El Paso, Texas. He has BFA in Theater from the University of North Carolina School of the Arts. In 2015, he became creative director of the nonprofit writing center The Greater Seattle Bureau of Fearless Ideas.
