= Dan Baum =

American journalist and writer (1956–2020)

- Born: Daniel Seth Baum; February 18, 1956; Orange, New Jersey, U.S.
- Died: October 8, 2020 (aged 64); Boulder, Colorado, U.S.
- Education: New York University
- Occupations: Journalist, writer
- Spouse: Margaret L. Knox (m. 1987)
- Children: 1
- Writing career
- Genre: Non-fiction

Dan Baum (February 18, 1956 – October 8, 2020) was an American journalist and author who wrote for The Wall Street Journal, The New Yorker, Rolling Stone, Wired, Playboy, and The New York Times Magazine, among other publications.

== Biography ==
Baum was born in Orange, New Jersey (or South Orange, New Jersey) to Seymour and Audrey Bernice (Goldberger) Baum. Raised in South Orange, Baum graduated from Columbia High School in 1974. He graduated from New York University in 1978.

He married Margaret L. Knox in 1987.

== Career ==
He wrote about his firing from The New Yorker in one of the first Twitter threads in the early days of Twitter.

Baum wrote four works of non-fiction including Nine Lives: Death and Life in New Orleans (2009). Baum wrote about New Orleans after Hurricane Katrina struck in 2005 for The New Yorker.

== Books ==
External videos
- Booknotes interview with Baum on Citizen Coors, June 11, 2000, C-SPAN

- Smoke and Mirrors: The War on Drugs and the Politics of Failure (1996), about federal drug policy
- Citizen Coors: An American Dynasty (2000), about the brewing family
- Nine Lives: Death and Life in New Orleans (2009)
- Gun Guys: A Road Trip (2013)

== Death ==
Baum died from glioblastoma in Boulder, Colorado on October 8, 2020.
