= Alcohol and Drugs History Society =

Academic organization

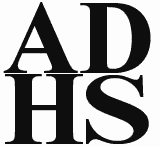
Logo

The Alcohol and Drugs History Society (ADHS) is a scholarly organization whose members study the history of a variety of illegal, regulated, and unregulated drugs such as opium, alcohol, and coffee. Organized in 2004, the ADHS is the successor to a society with a more limited scope, the Alcohol and Temperance History Group, which existed for 25 years. The last ATHG president and the first ADHS president was Ian R. Tyrrell, Professor of History at the University of New South Wales, in Australia. In July 2006 he was succeeded by W.J. Rorabaugh, Professor of History at the University of Washington. In July, 2008, David T. Courtwright, Professor of History at the University of North Florida became president. In 2011 Joseph Spillane, Associate Professor of History at the University of Florida, succeeded him as president.

The ADHS sponsors the academic journal The Social History of Alcohol and Drugs: an Interdisciplinary Journal (SHAD). The journal appears in both printed and electronic formats, published twice a year, in the winter and the summer. Starting in 2019, the journal was published by the University of Chicago Press. SHAD's editorial structure recently changed and its current co-editors are David Herzberg (SUNY-Buffalo), Nancy Campbell (Rensselaer Polytechnic Institute), and Lucas Richert (University of Strathclyde). Its former editor-in-chief is Dan Malleck, from Brock University, St. Catharines, Canada. Other former editors include Jim Mills, from University of Strathclyde in Glasgow, Scotland; W. Scott Haine, from California, and the Reviews Editors are James Nicholls, from Bath Spa University, England and Alex Mold, from the London School of Hygiene and Tropical Medicine. In November, 2009 it created an editorial board, which is populated by some of the most prominent alcohol and drugs history scholars in the world.

The ADHS is affiliated with the American Historical Association and sponsors sessions at the January meetings of the AHA.

The ADHS held an international conference in Canada in August 2007, with Guelph University (Ontario) as the host The next international conference was in 2009 at Glasgow, Scotland, with the University of Strathclyde as the host. In 2011 an international conference was held at the State University of New York, Buffalo. In 2015 the ADHS met at Bowling Green State University in Ohio, USA. In 2017 there was an international conference at the University of Utrecht, The Netherlands. Shanghai will serve as host for the 2019 meeting.

== Also ==
- Drunken monkey hypothesis
- Stoned ape theory
