= Cannabis cookbook =

Cookbook for preparing cannabis edibles

A cannabis cookbook is a cookbook for preparing cannabis edibles, often in the form of a baking guide. According to The New York Times, baking recipes are popular because "[THC] dosing is easier to control in batter-based dishes or chocolate". Such cookbooks existed prior to United States legalization; The Alice B. Toklas Cook Book published in 1954, for instance, or The Marijuana Chef Cookbook published in 2001 under the pseudonym S.T. Oner, but became more commonplace after California and other states legalized in the 2010s. Notable chefs like Laurie Wolf and Jasmine Shimoda have created or contributed to cannabis cookbooks.

== See also ==
- List of books about cannabis
- List of cannabis columns
