= This Is Your Country On Drugs =

2009 non-fiction book by Ryan Grim

This Is Your Country On Drugs: The Secret History of Getting High in America
- Author: Ryan Grim
- Subject: Prohibition of drugs in the United States
- Genre: Nonfiction
- Publisher: Wiley
- Publication date: June 22, 2009
- ISBN: 978-0-470-16739-7
- OCLC: 705862514

This Is Your Country On Drugs: The Secret History of Getting High in America is a 2009 nonfiction book by Ryan Grim. Topics covered include the prohibition of LSD and anti-cannabis public service announcements. Publishers Weekly said it was a "sharp critique of anti-drug programs". The Austin Chronicle recommended it as a holiday gift for "the hard-to-buy-for drug policy reformer on your list". It has been required reading in university public health curricula, and cited in a RAND Corporation drug policy research paper.
