= Inland navigation =

Water transportation on rivers and other internal waters

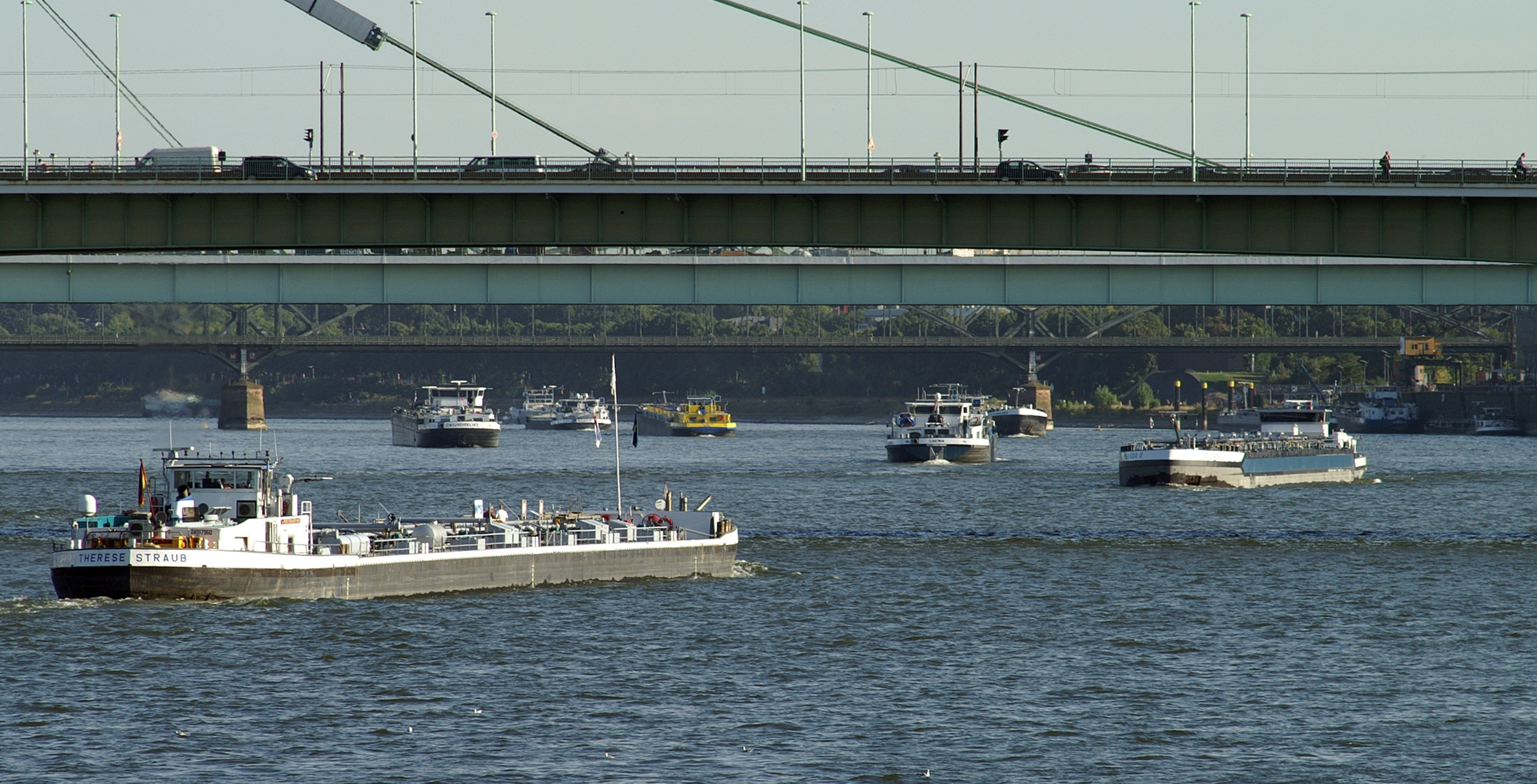
Freight ships on the Rhine in Cologne, Germany (2012)

Inland navigation, inland barge transport or inland waterway transport (IWT) is a transport system allowing ships and barges to use inland waterways (such as canals, rivers and lakes). These waterways have inland ports, marinas, quays, and wharfs.

== Environment ==
Average external costs of freight transport (EU-28, 2016) per transport mode
| Mode | eurocent per tonne-kilometre |
|---|---|
| Road (LCV) | 35.6 |
| Road (HGV) | 4.2 |
| Rail (diesel) | 1.8 |
| Rail (electric) | 1.1 |
| Inland vessel | 1.9 |

Modern researchers have long recognized that inland navigation is a relatively environmentally friendly option for freight transport compared to other modes of transportation such as air carriage and road transport, and similar to rail freight transport. Therefore, policy makers have been aiming to shift the volume of cargo transported by more pollutive means towards inland navigation in order to reduce the overall environmental impact of transport, for example, as part of the European Green Deal (2019). To accomplish this, however, various challenges need to be tackled, including making inland navigation itself less pollutive than it has been, building larger barges and tows to increase their efficiency, and constructing or improving inland waterways navigable enough for the projected volume and size of ships (deep and wide enough, with mega-locks for differences in elevation) to avoid bottlenecks. The environmental effects of constructing, operating and maintaining inland navigation also need to be mitigated.

== See also ==
- Water transport in India
- Central Commission for Navigation on the Rhine
- Inland waterways of the United States
- Classification of European Inland Waterways
- Code Européen des Voies de la Navigation Intérieure (European Code for Interior Navigation)
- Grand Canal (China)
- Internal waters
- Navigability
- Roll-on/roll-off car carrying ship
- Container port design process
- Container on barge
