= Port of Kansas City =

Coordinates: 39.1125°N 94.6105°W

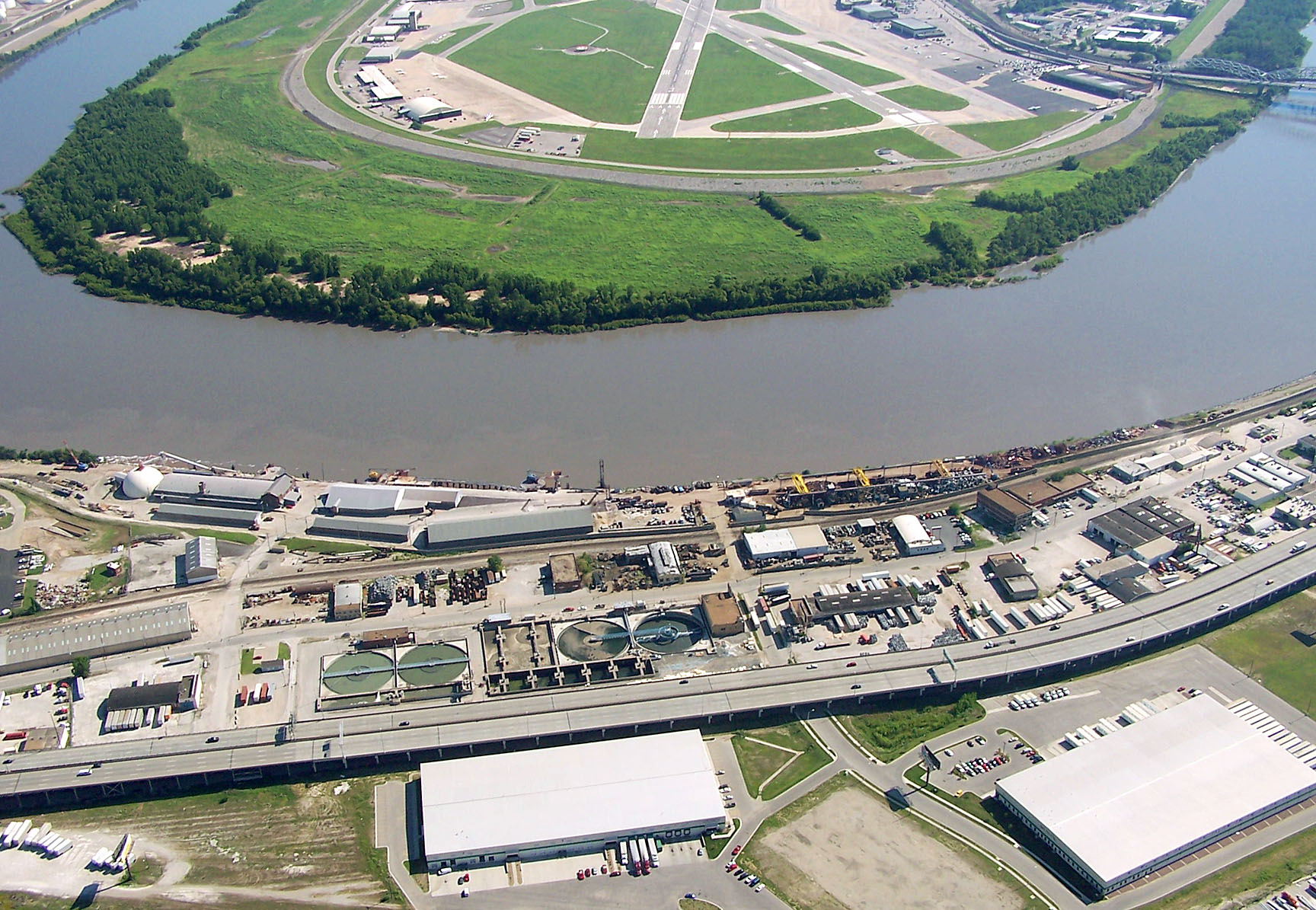
The Port of Kansas City

The Port of Kansas City is an inland port on the Missouri River in Kansas City, Missouri at river mile 367.1, near the confluence with the Kansas River. Kansas City, the second-largest rail hub and third-largest trucking hub in the country, is on marine highway M-70, which extends as far as Pittsburgh and intersects M-55 at St. Louis, allowing shipping to New Orleans, Chicago, Minneapolis and connections to major cities all over the eastern United States. The Missouri inland waterway allows for barge traffic as far upriver as Sioux City, Iowa; however, most of the commercial traffic on the Missouri is concentrated between Kansas City and St. Louis.

The intermodal facility has approximately 160,000 square feet (15,000 m^{2}) of storage space, a loading system consisting of three 25-ton cranes, one 100-ton crane, eight front-end loaders, portable conveyor systems, and a truck scale. Products shipped through the terminal include fertilizer, grain, corn, meal, bark, rock clinker, salt, rolled and coiled steel, H-beams, plate steel, rebar and petroleum coke. The terminal is served by the Union Pacific Railroad, with extensive rail track at the facility for loading and unloading containers.

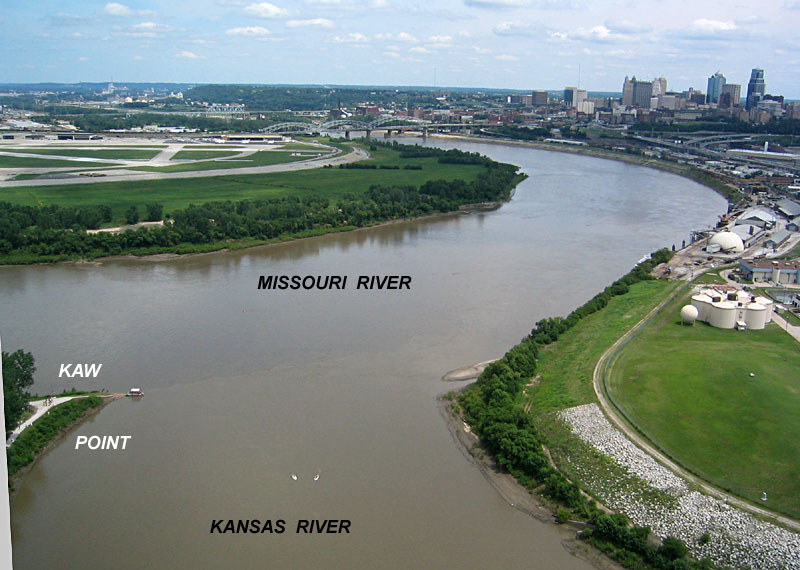
Missouri River at Kansas City

Typically, shipment by barge is cheaper than other modes of transportation, with less negative impact on the environment. However, the marine shipping industry has suffered on the Missouri due to years of drought and a shipping season that closes during the winter months. The Army Corps of Engineers is supposed to maintain a shipping channel of at least 9 feet (2.7 m) deep on the Missouri year-round. During low-water season, the depth is controlled by dams hundreds of miles up river; the Corps manages those dams for a variety of purposes including chiefly flood control and navigation, but also recreation and environmental directives. These various uses often conflict. The Corps has drawn sharp criticism from Missouri Governor Jay Nixon and Kansas Governor Sam Brownback.

After seeing years of decline and dwindling tonnage levels, the Port of Kansas City closed in 2007. However, the Kansas City Port Authority took over the port and reopened it in August 2012 for commercial use. At one time, the Port of Kansas City shipped and received millions of tons of freight; however when it ceased operations in 2007 it was only processing 600,000 tons of freight a year. The Port has since undergone extensive renovations, which were completed in 2016. The Kansas City Port Authority is trying to revive the barge industry in Kansas City, and believes it can be a great economic engine for the Kansas City area. They have recently hired a Director of Port Operations who has been tasked to establish sustainable levels of freight operations and oversee the eventual public–private partnership of the port.

Kansas City NWSL unveiled plans to construct the first purpose-built stadium for North American women's professional soccer in 2021, located at the Port of Kansas City. The stadium is planned to be built in Kansas City, Missouri at the Richard L. Berkley Riverfront Park with an estimated cost of $70-million. The project will be entirely privately financed through the ownership group, with the team signing a 50-year lease for the site at which the stadium will be located.

The stadium, CPKC Stadium, opened on March 16, 2024, and has served as the home of the team, renamed Kansas City Current, ever since.
