= Afflick =

Afflick is a surname. Notable people with the surname include:

- Rhammel Afflick (born 1994), British writer
- Lester Afflick (1956–2000), Jamaican writer
- Mark Afflickm Australian rugby league player
- Elena Fuentes-Afflick, American pediatrician
