= Seaway =

Seaway may refer to:

- Seaway (band), a pop punk band from Canada.
- Sound (geography), a sea or ocean inlet larger than a bay, deeper than a bight, and wider than a fjord
- Strait, a narrow sea or ocean channel between two bodies of land
- Sea lane or shipping lane, a regularly-used route for vessels on oceans and large lakes
- Seaway (TV Series), Canadian drama series that aired on CBC Television 1965–1966

== See also ==
- Sea (disambiguation)
- Way (disambiguation)
- Seagate (disambiguation)
- Waterways (disambiguation)
- Oceanway
