= United States Marine Highway Program =

Network of navigable waterways in the United States

U.S. Marine Highway Program routes as of October 2023

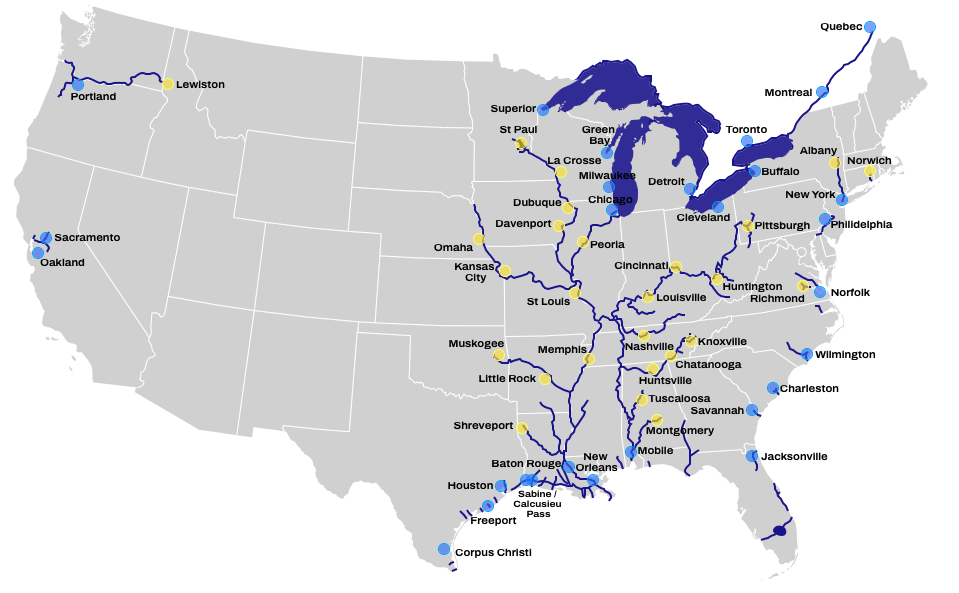
Inland waterway system

The United States Marine Highway Program is a United States Department of Transportation (DOT) initiative authorized to increase use of the United States' 29,000 mi (47,000 km) of navigable waterways to alleviate traffic and wear to the nation's highways caused by tractor trailer traffic. The program is managed by the Maritime Administration's Office of Ports & Waterways Planning.

In 2007 Congress included provisions to Public Law 110-140, to "Offer a waterborne alternative to available land-side transportation services using documented Vessels" and "Provide transportation services for passengers or freight (or both) that may reduce congestion on land-side infrastructure using documented vessels." As the United States' population grows, its need to transport freight within its borders also grows. This increases the need for fossil fuels and damages the nation's highways. It is estimated that in 2008, 3.7 billion hours were lost and 2.3 billion US gallons (8.7×10^{9} L) of fuel were spent in traffic jams by Americans. Alongside grassroots efforts to reduce this congestion and greenhouse gas, such as the idea of "buying local", the federal government is looking to its navigable waterways to help alleviate the problem.

The Coast Guard and Marine Transportation Act of 2012 Public Law 112-213 added 'public benefits' as one of the program's mandates. In 2016, the National Defense Authorization Act for Fiscal Year 2016 Public Law 114-92 amended the program yet again by adding freight that is "shipped in discrete units or packages that are handled individually, palletized, or unitized for purposes of transportation." The National Defense Authorization Act for 2020 Public Law 116-92 changed the program name from the Short Sea Transportation Program to the Marine Highway Transportation Program. The National Defense Authorization Act for 2023, Public Law 117-263, made the most dramatic change to the program by adding, "bulk, liquid, or loose cargo loaded in tanks, holds, hoppers, or on deck" as well as adding marine highway services that operate between a port on the United States Marine Highway to and from Canada and Mexico. The law eliminated the need to be a "Designated Project" to be eligible for Marine Highway Grant funding. The law also changed the name of the program from the America's Marine Highway Program to the United States Marine Highway Program.

Research has shown that transporting by barge or ship is the most fuel-efficient method of transporting goods (per Ton-Mile), being over eight times more efficient than tractor-trailers and double what is achievable by rail. It also does not face the transportation limits truckers face in "hours driving". A driver is only allowed to be on the road 11 hours out of 21; this drops their average speed effectively in half when transiting more than 600 mi (970 km). A teamster's daily range is also dependent on highway traffic congestion and bottlenecks (such as weigh-stations and toll booths) whereby their daily range could be even less.

== History ==
Waterborne transport has been important to Americans since the settling of Jamestown, when travel between plantation was as likely to be by boat as by road. Until World War II, Texas oil was transported to the East Coast by tanker, when it was replaced by the Big Inch pipeline. Coastwise transport on the first container ship, the SS Ideal X in 1958, from Newark, New Jersey, to Houston, Texas, ignited an industry. The United States Marine Highway Program is MARAD's effort to stimulate low cost, green barges in places where they have not been employed.

== Approach to funding ==
The United States studied Europe's model of Short Sea Shipping, and has taken a different approach to how it will encourage business and shipping lines to return to the nation's intracoastal waterways. The Secretary of Transportation has identified several heavily congested motorways throughout the US that have an acceptable waterway alternative. These routes are identified with an 'M' designator, for example: M-5 identifies the coastal alternative to I-5 between San Diego, CA and Seattle, WA. Once these routes have been identified, state and local government agencies can apply for 'Transportation Investment Generating Economic Recovery' (TIGER) Grants to improve port infrastructure and encourage the use of water-side shipping. These grants are not intended to 'subsidize' shipping industries, but to purchase equipment needed to expand existing marine highway services, or to create new services. This is intended to offset start-up or expansion costs for marine highway services.

Since 2010, Congress has appropriated $76.6 million for the US Marine Highway Grant Program. In addition, the Bi-Partisan Infrastructure Law Public Law 117-58 added an additional $25 million in appropriated funding. These funds have been used primarily to purchase material handling equipment and to purchase or build barges along the inland waterways. With the expansion into Canada and Mexico, Congress ensured the funds would not be spent in those countries.

With intermodal transit standardized in the U.S., transferring goods with different modes of transport does not require longshoremen or terminal workers to re-pack material. This leads to a lower chance of product loss or damage. Many ports have refined the transferring of a container off a truck and onto a container barge or ship into an art form and can accomplish it in under a minute.

== Potential drawbacks ==
=== Environmental ===
For years the United States has had regulations concerning the handling of ballast water for transcontinental shipping. The goal was to minimize the cross contamination of invasive marine species into virgin waters. Major shipping hubs such as the Port of Long Beach, Port of New York and New Jersey, and the Port of Houston have already been contaminated for generations. Short Sea shipping will use these ports like spokes of a wheel to smaller, easier to access ports, and there are concerns of 'secondary contamination' to these smaller estuaries.

=== Trucking companies ===
The Teamsters Union, as of May 2013 has yet to publish a stance on federal backing of this third contender to many shipping markets, MARAD and maritime shipping leaders believe they are helping the Teamsters by moving freight out of areas with low Teamster-to-Cargo Ratios, and into ports where the ratio is closer to 1:1 or better. They also believe that the Marine Highway can better handle the nation's north-south transit, though there are no east-west sailing corridors and those will always be land-side transits. Truck drivers, under DOT regulation, are limited in the number of hours they are allowed to drive in a day. These limits do not allow for traffic, waiting to load or unload, or check points. A ferry, or Roll-on/Roll-off Vessel would allow a driver to keep moving his cargo to its ultimate destination while they take their mandatory off-duty hours.

=== Small business concerns ===
The benefit of shipping by truck is convenience. The teamster who picks up the merchandise is contractually bound to ensure its delivery to the product's destination. Using Short Sea Shipping adds two more legs to the shipping equation. The first teamster carries the goods from its point of origin to the port authority, from there by barge or ship to the second port authority. A second teamster then collects the cargo and delivers it to the final destination. This forces the business owner to either work with a single large trucking company working in both ports, or coordinate with two owner-operators independently, and possibly have the cargo sitting on a pierside holding area until a second trucking contract can be agreed upon.

=== Cabotage laws ===
The Merchant Marine Act of 1920, also known as the Jones Act, prohibits foreign ships from carrying cargo or passengers between U.S. ports, a practice called cabotage. Ships that wish to trade between U.S. ports must be built and flagged in the U.S. and have at least three-fourths of their crew-members U.S. citizens or permanent residents. Large container ships that already stop at several ports along the U.S. coasts could move containers between those ports at low cost but for the Jones Act.

== Expanding into the future ==
The United States Navy is considering the United States Marine Highway as an opportunity to breathe life into their aging Military Sealift Command (MSC) Fleet. Currently, if a national crisis were to take place, the U.S. government would need to rely heavily on foreign support to transport its Armed Forces, much like during Operations Desert Shield and Desert Storm. The US Navy entered into a Memorandum of Agreement with MARAD to develop a U.S. built and U.S. crewed dual-use vessel to sail in peacetime in trade and to provide a sealift capability during times of National Emergency.

== List of routes ==
Most routes along The United States Marine Highway are numbered after a landside highway that it runs parallel to, typically an Interstate Highway.

| Number | Name | Associated landside route(s) | Southern or western terminus | Northern or eastern terminus | Notes |
|---|---|---|---|---|---|
| M-2 | Puerto Rico | PR-2 | Loop around the ocean channels of Puerto Rico | | |
| M-3 | Kaskaskia River | IL 3 | Chester, Illinois | Fayetteville, Illinois | |
| M-5 | Pacific Ocean Coastal Waters | I-5 | San Diego | M-5 (AK) at the Canadian border near Bellingham, Washington | |
| M-5 (AK) | Alaska Coastline | ALCAN Highway and Richardson Highway | M-5 at the Canadian border near Bellingham, Washington | Unalaska, Alaska | Numbered as a northern extension of M-5 along the Alaska coast |
| M-10 | Gulf Coastline | I-10 | Brownsville, Texas | Port Manatee, Florida | |
| M-29 | Missouri River | I-29 | Sioux City, Iowa | M-70 in Kansas City, Missouri | |
| M-35 | Upper Mississippi River | I-35 | M-55 near Grafton, Illinois | Minneapolis, Minnesota | |
| M-40 | Arkansas, Verdigris, and White Rivers | I-40 | Catoosa, Oklahoma | M-55 near Napoleon, Arkansas | |
| M-49 | Atchafalaya River and J. Bennett Johnson Waterway | I-49 | M-10 near Morgan City, Louisiana | Shreveport, Louisiana | |
| M-55 | Mississippi and Illinois Rivers | I-55 | M-10 near New Orleans | M-90 in Chicago | |
| M-65 | Mobile - Black Warrior Rivers and Tombigbee Waterway | I-65 | M-10 near Mobile, Alabama | Near Birmingham, Alabama (via the Black Warrior) and M-55 in Cairo, Illinois (via the Tombigbee Waterway) | |
| M-64 | Hampton Roads, Chesapeake Bay, and James River | I-64 | Richmond, Virginia | M-95 near Norfolk, Virginia | |
| M-69 | Texas Gulf Intracoastal Waterway | I-69 | Brownsville, Texas | Port Arthur, Texas | |
| M-70 | Ohio, Mississippi, and Missouri Rivers | I-70 | M-55 in St. Louis | Pittsburgh | |
| M-71/77 | Lake Erie | I-71 / I-77 | Cleveland | Detroit | |
| M-75 | Detroit and Lake Erie | I-75 | Toledo, Ohio | Detroit | |
| M-84 | Columbia, Willamette and Snake Rivers | I-84 | M-5 near Astoria, Oregon | Lewiston, Idaho | |
| M-87 | Hudson River and Erie Canal | I-87 | M-95 in New York City | M-90 in Albany, New York | |
| M-90 | The Great Lakes and St. Lawrence Seaway System | I-90 | Duluth, Minnesota (via Lake Superior) and Chicago (via Lake Michigan) | M-87 in Albany, New York (via the Erie Canal) and the St. Lawrence Seaway (via Lake Ontario) | |
| M-95 | Atlantic Ocean Coastal Waters | I-95 | Miami | Portland, Maine | |
| M-146 | Houston Ship Channel, Buffalo Bayou, and Galveston Bay | SH 146 | M-10 in Galveston, Texas | Houston | |
| M-295 | East River, Long Island Sound, and Block Island Sound | I-295 | M-87 in New York City | M-95 near Block Island | |
| M-495 | Anacostia, Occoquan, and Potomac Rivers | I-495 | Washington, D.C. | M-95 at Chesapeake Bay | |
| M-580 | San Joaquin and Sacramento Rivers | I-580 | M-5 near San Francisco | Stockton, California (via the San Joaquin) and Sacramento, California (via the Sacramento) | |
| M-A1 | Matanuska and Susitna Rivers, Anchorage, AK | I-A1 | M-5 (AK) at the Cook Inlet | Palmer, Alaska (via the Matanuska) and Talkeetna, Alaska (via the Susitna) | |
| M-AS1 | American Samoa | —N/a | Loop around the waterways and ocean channels of America Samoa | | |
| M-GNM1 | Guam and the Commonwealth of the Northern Mariana Islands | —N/a | Loop around the waterways and ocean channels of Guam; and the Northern Mariana Islands' main islands of Rota, Tinian, and Saipan | | |
| M-H1 | Hawaiian Islands | I-H1 | Loop around the waterways and ocean channels of Hawaii | | |
| M-V1 | U.S. Virgin Islands | —N/a | Loop around the waterways and ocean channels of the major islands of Saint Croix, Saint John, Saint Thomas and Water Island | | |

== See also ==
- Intracoastal Waterway
- Louisiana International Terminal
