= Waterways (disambiguation) =

Waterways are navigable bodies of water.

Waterways or variant, may also refer to:

== Places ==
- Waterways, Victoria, a suburb of Melbourne, Australia
- Waterways, Alberta, a locality within the Regional Municipality of Wood Buffalo, Alberta, Canada
- Waterways, Oxford, a housing estate in North Oxford, England, UK

== Art, entertainment, and media ==
- Waterways: Poetry in the Mainstream, a literary magazine and New York City arts in education program
- The Waterways Journal Weekly, a news journal for the towing and barge industry
- Waterways (TV series), an Irish documentary programme on RTÉ One

== Other uses ==
- The Waterways Trust, a UK independent national charity
- Waterways Experiment Station, a research facility in Vicksburg, Mississippi, US
- Waterways Visitor Centre, a facility near Grand Canal Dock, Dublin, Ireland

== See also ==
- watercourse
- The Way of Water
- Way of Water
