= Container port =

Facility handling shipping containers

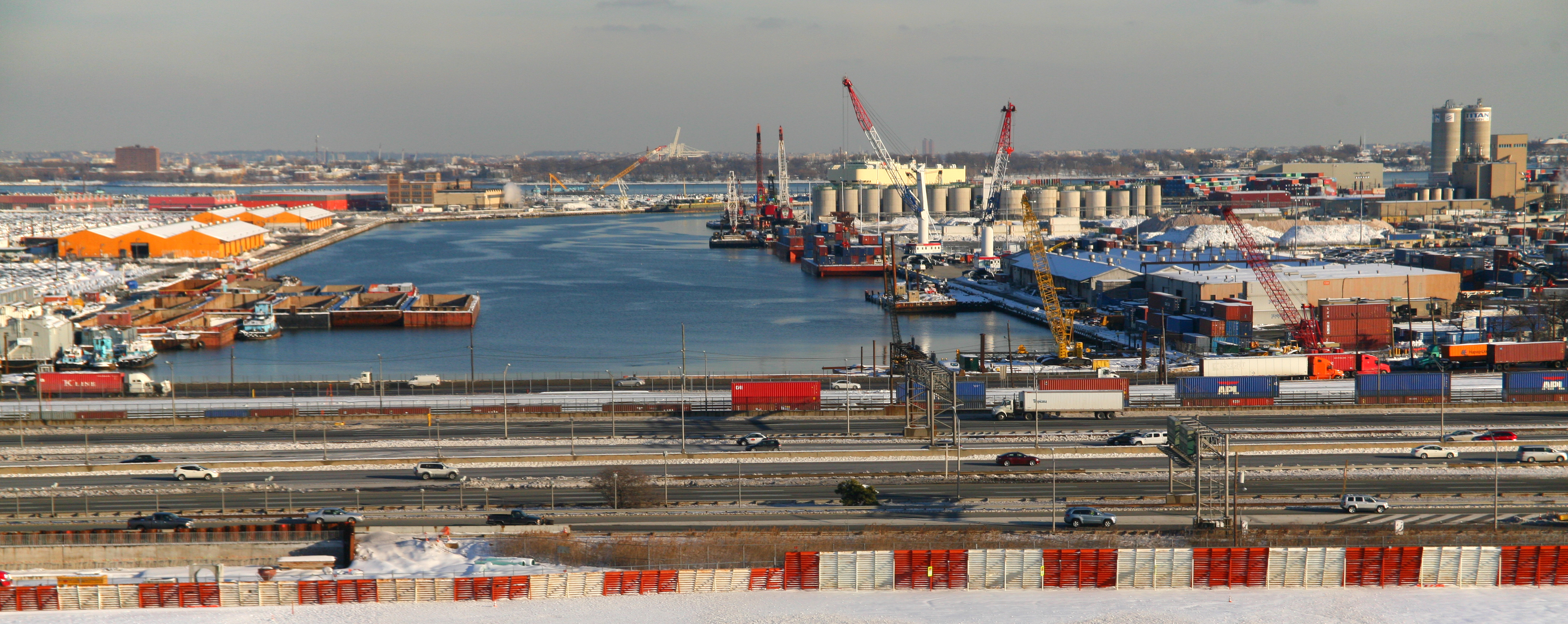
The Port Newark–Elizabeth Marine Terminal in New Jersey was the world's first maritime container port and is one of the largest and busiest.

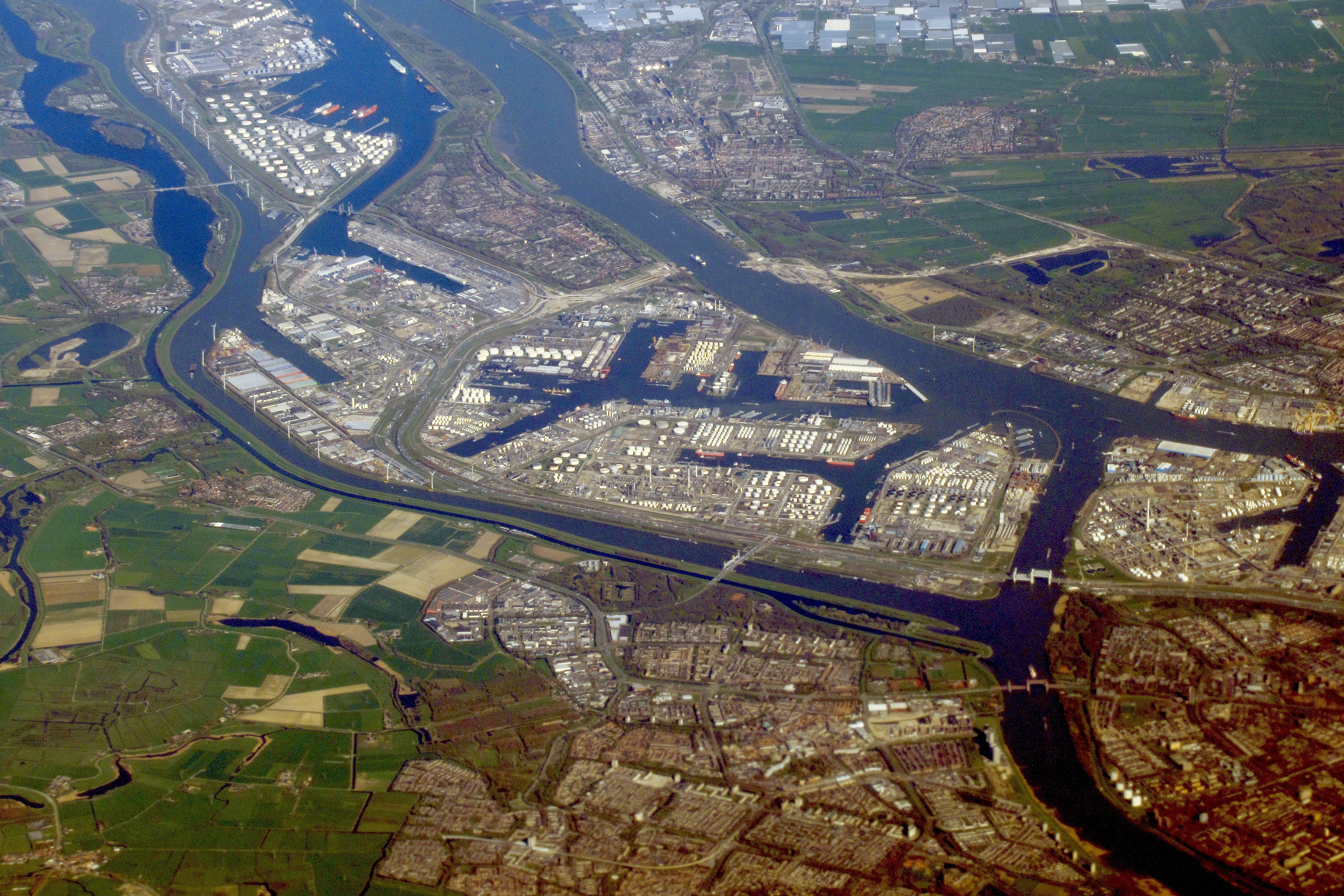
Port of Rotterdam is the largest container port in Europe

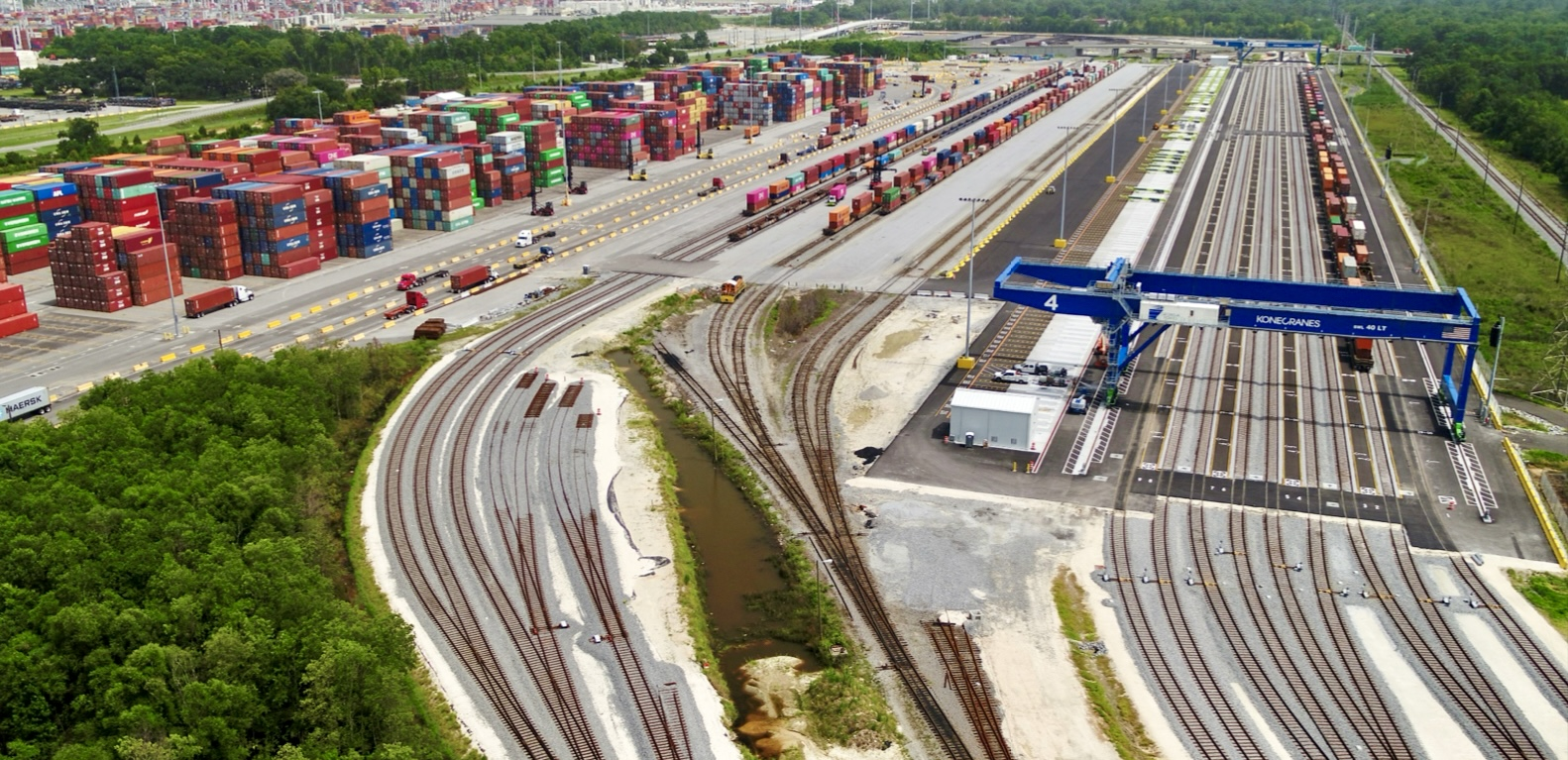
Intermodal terminal in Garden City, Georgia at the Port of Savannah.

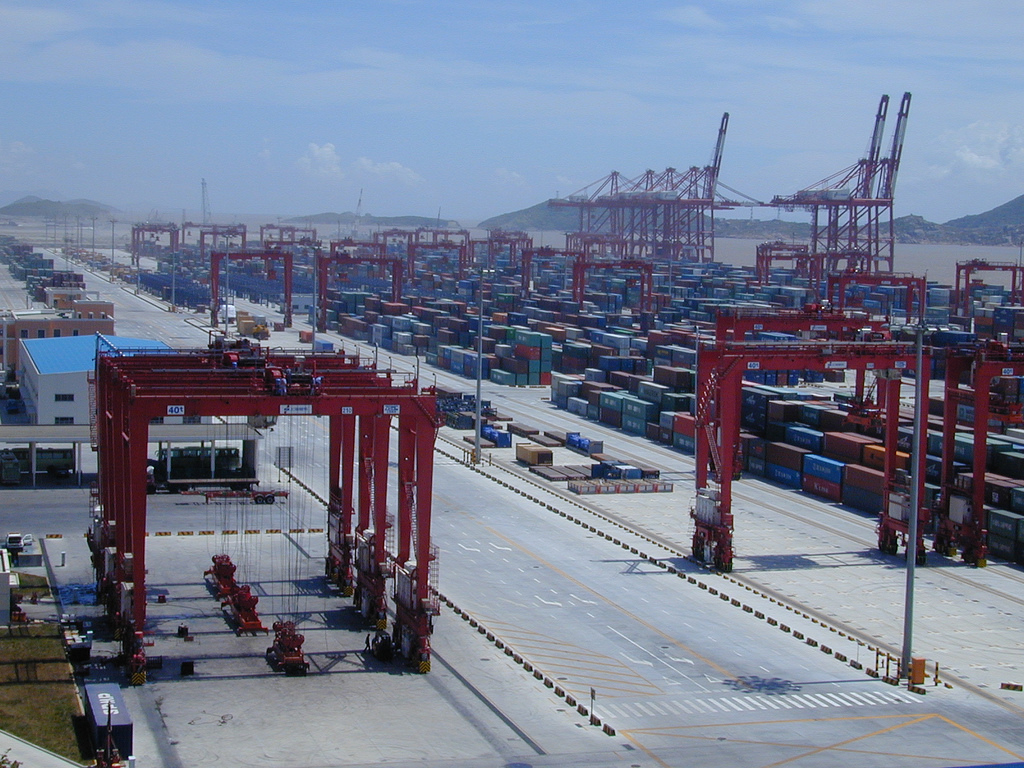
Shanghai Port is the world's busiest maritime container port

A container port, container terminal, or intermodal terminal is a facility where cargo containers are transshipped between different transport vehicles, for onward transportation. The transshipment may be between container ships and land vehicles, for example trains or trucks, in which case the terminal is described as a maritime container port. Alternatively, the transshipment may be between land vehicles, typically between train and truck, in which case the terminal is described as an inland container port.

In November 1932, the first inland container port in the world was opened by the Pennsylvania Railroad company in Enola, Pennsylvania.

Port Newark-Elizabeth on the Newark Bay in the Port of New York and New Jersey is considered the world's first maritime container port. On April 26, 1956, the Ideal X was rigged for an experiment to use standardized cargo containers that were stacked and then unloaded to a compatible truck chassis at Port Newark. The concept had been developed by the McLean Trucking Company. On August 15, 1962, the Port Authority of New York and New Jersey opened the world’s first container port, Elizabeth Marine Terminal.

Maritime container ports tend to be part of a larger port, and the biggest maritime container ports can be found situated around major harbours. Inland container ports tend to be located in or near major cities, with good rail connections to maritime container ports.

It is common for cargo that arrives to a container port in a single ship to be distributed over several modes of transportation for delivery to inland customers. According to a manager from the Port of Rotterdam, it may be fairly typical way for the cargo of a large 18,000 TEU container ship to be distributed over 19 container trains (74 TEU each), 32 barges (97 TEU each) and 1,560 trucks (1.6 TEU each, on average). Many of these container ports use remotely-controlled STS gantry crane to organize cargo and transfer between modes.

Both maritime and inland container ports usually provide storage facilities for both loaded and empty containers. Loaded containers are stored for relatively short periods, whilst waiting for onward transportation, whilst unloaded containers may be stored for longer periods awaiting their next use. Containers are normally stacked for storage, and the resulting stores are known as container stacks.

In recent years, methodological advances regarding container port operations have considerably improved, such as container port design process. For a detailed description and a comprehensive list of references see, e.g., the operations research literature.

== Container Port Operators ==
This is a list of the world's top 10 largest container port operators in 2024 according to Lloyd's List.

#	Port Operator	Country
1	PSA International	Singapore
2	China Merchants Port Holdings (China Merchants Port and 49% of Terminal Link)	China
3	COSCO Shipping Ports	China
4	APM Terminals	Netherlands
5	DP World	United Arab Emirates
6	Hutchison Port Holdings	Hong Kong
7	MSC (Terminal Investment Limited and Africa Global Logistics)	Switzerland
8	International Container Terminal Services	Philippines
9	CMA CGM (CMA Terminals Holding and 51% of Terminal Link)	France
10	Yıldırım Holding (Yilport)	Turkey

== See also ==
- Container port design process
- Containerization
- Container on barge
- Container ship
- Dock (maritime)
- List of container ports
- List of largest container shipping companies
- Warehouse
