= Louisiana International Terminal =

Container port project in Louisiana, USA

Coordinates: 29.8986°N 89.9009°W

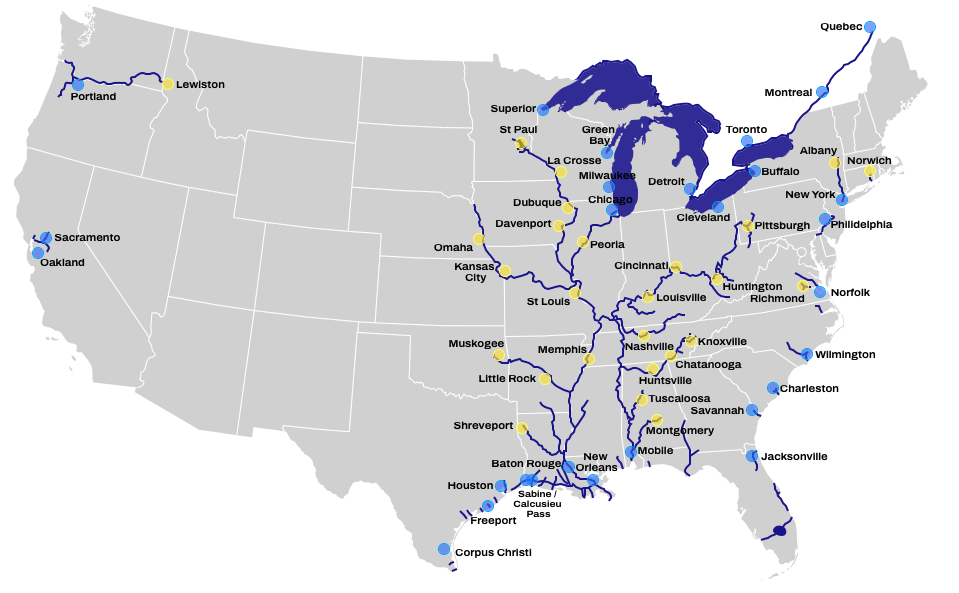
Inland waterway system

The Louisiana International Terminal (LIT) is a planned container terminal on the lower Mississippi River in Violet, St. Bernard Parish, Louisiana. The project is being developed through a public–private partnership involving the Port of New Orleans, Ports America and Terminal Investment Limited, the terminal investment arm of the Mediterranean Shipping Company. Its location downstream of the Crescent City Connection is intended to accommodate container ships that cannot pass beneath the bridge.

In August 2026, the port announced that the United States Army Corps of Engineers had issued a federal permit authorizing construction. Port president and chief executive Beth Branch said construction was expected to begin during 2026 and take approximately five years.

== Development ==
The Port of New Orleans acquired land for the terminal in December 2020 and began the permitting process in June 2021. It awarded a preliminary design and permitting-support contract to AECOM in July 2021 and selected HDR Engineering for program management the following month.

On December 12, 2022, Governor John Bel Edwards announced a partnership to develop the terminal at an estimated cost of $1.8 billion. Ports America and Terminal Investment Limited committed $800 million toward the project, with additional funding expected from the port and state and federal sources. Their joint venture was also expected to operate the terminal. The announcement projected a construction start in 2025 and the opening of the first berth in 2028.

In January 2024, the port announced a $226.2 million award through the United States Department of Transportation's Infrastructure for Rebuilding America grant program. Together with a $73.77 million award through the department's MEGA program, federal grants for the terminal's first construction phase totaled approximately $300 million.

The Corps held a public hearing on the proposal in Chalmette on May 27, 2025. Federal construction approval was announced in August 2026, when the port outlined a revised construction schedule.

== Site and transportation ==
The port purchased approximately 1,200 acres (490 ha) in Violet for the terminal, associated warehousing and logistics services, and buffer areas. The plans announced in 2022 called for an eventual annual capacity of two million twenty-foot equivalent units. The terminal would use the Mississippi River's 50-foot (15 m) shipping channel and avoid the bridge-clearance limitations affecting container ships traveling farther upriver.

The project is intended to connect ocean shipping with rail, highway and inland waterway transportation. Plans include rail access through the New Orleans Public Belt Railroad and facilities supporting container-on-barge services.

A related project, the St. Bernard Transportation Corridor, is intended to connect the terminal with Interstate 510. In March 2024, the port announced $15 million in federal funding for planning, environmental and engineering work on the corridor. Louisiana had separately committed $50 million for its design. The port described the proposed corridor as an elevated roadway being developed alongside the terminal.

== Local response and litigation ==
The project has drawn opposition from residents concerned about truck traffic, pollution and other environmental effects. At the May 2025 Corps hearing, opponents also questioned whether projected employment benefits would reach parish residents. Port officials argued that the terminal would accommodate larger ships and help Louisiana remain competitive in maritime trade. The organization Save Our St. Bernard continued opposing the project after federal construction approval was announced in August 2026.

St. Bernard Parish government filed a lawsuit challenging the Port of New Orleans' authority to develop the terminal within the parish. In September 2026, Judge Darren M. Roy of the 34th Judicial District Court rejected attempts by the Port of New Orleans and the St. Bernard Port, Harbor and Terminal District to dismiss the suit. The ruling allowed the case to proceed but did not decide the merits of the parish's claims. The Port of New Orleans said it would continue defending its authority and advancing the project.

== See also ==
- United States container ports
- Inland waterways of the United States
