= Maurice Kenny =

American poet

Maurice Frank Kenny
- Born: Maurice Frank Kenny; August 16, 1929; Watertown, New York, U.S.
- Died: April 16, 2016 (aged 86); Saranac Lake, New York, U.S.
- Education: Butler University (BA); New York University
- Occupation: Poet
- Awards: American Book Awards (1984)

Maurice Frank Kenny (August 16, 1929 – April 16, 2016) was an American poet who identified as Mohawk descent.

== Life ==
Maurice Frank Kenny was born on August 16, 1929, in Watertown, New York. He identified his father as being of Mohawk and Irish ancestry, from Canada and his mother, who was born in Upstate New York, as being of English and Seneca ancestry. Despite identifying as being of Native American descent, he was not enrolled in any Native nation.

The Kenny family, which also included two older sisters, lived in Watertown and Kenny spend his school years there and his summers on his relatives' farm in nearby Cape Vincent until his parents separated when he was "eleven or twelve". His mother moved to Bayonne, New Jersey and his father remained in Watertown, with young Maurice remaining predominantly in his father's custody for most of his adolescence. He briefly stayed with friends of his mother's in Syracuse, New York before running away, after which he moved to his mother's residence in Bayonne when he was sixteen. Rather than attending school there, Kenny skipped classes regularly, preferring to go into Manhattan and seek autographs from stars of film and theatre outside hotels. After several months of this, Kenny was brought before a juvenile judge for truancy and had to be returned to his father's custody and to Watertown, where he completed his high school years.

After graduation, Kenny spent a summer with a traveling theater troupe in Alexandria Bay, New York. Thereafter, he spent a year in New York trying to break into the theatre as an actor, but returned to Watertown after a year. He spent four years studying at Butler University under such esteemed instructors as Werner Beyer and Roy Marz, graduating in 1956 with a degree in English. Kenny once again returned to Watertown briefly after graduating, taking classes with Douglas Angus at nearby St. Lawrence University in Canton, New York. He left again for Manhattan in 1957, intending to enroll at Columbia University, but instead became the manager of a branch of Marboro Books, a position that put him in contact with all manner of literary, cinematic, and theatrical figures. He also began taking courses at New York University, where he met poet and critic Louise Bogan, the greatest influence on his early development as a writer.

During the early 1960s, Kenny moved to Mexico, where he worked as a secretary for the novelist Willard Motley. In 1964, he moved to the United States Virgin Islands, and then in 1966 to Chicago, where he wrote obituaries for the Chicago Sun-Times, before returning to New York in 1967 and settling in Brooklyn, which was his home until 1984.

During the 1970s and early 1980s, Kenny was increasingly active in Native American activism, having undergone an awakening to the extent and significance of his own Mohawk identity in the wake of the Occupation of Alcatraz in 1969. He was prevented from being at Wounded Knee in 1973 because of health issues, but wrote a poem entitled "I Am the Sun" that adapted a traditional Lakota chant into a statement of solidarity with the protesters and activists. Having not published extensively since the early 1960s, Kenny embarked on the most productive period of his life in the late 1970s, producing more than twenty books of poetry, fiction, and non-fiction over the next two decades, as well as co-editing the journal Contact/II with Josh Gosciak and running the independent Strawberry Press, which published predominantly Native authors.

After 1984, Kenny divided his time primarily between the upstate New York towns of Saranac Lake, and Potsdam. He taught at North Country Community College, Paul Smith's College, and SUNY Potsdam and retired from his teaching duties at the latter in 2011. He lived the final years of his life in Saranac Lake, where he died on April 16, 2016. At the time of his death, he was working on six separate book manuscripts, including an autobiography and several collections of poetry on topics ranging from Frida Kahlo to the Dutch settlement of the Hudson Valley during the 1600s.

== Education ==
Kenny was educated at Butler University, St. Lawrence University and New York University, where he studied with American poet Louise Bogan.

== Career ==
Kenny was co-editor with Josh Gosciak of Contact/II, a literary magazine and occasional poetry press that was active between 1976 and 1993. Kenny was also the editor and publisher of Strawberry Press (most active in the 1970s and 1980s) and Many Moons Press (most active in the 2000s and 2010s). Strawberry Press published poems and artwork, often in postcard form, by Native Americans. Many Moons Press published poetry and artwork primarily from writers and artists associated with the North Country of New York State, including photographer Mark Kurtz and poets Dan Bodah and Ethan Shantie.

Kenny read his poetry throughout the United States and Europe, including in Germany, the Czech Republic, Belgium, France, and Austria during two visits to the continent in 2011 and 2012. Notable New York City readings included the Poetry Festival at St. Clement's Church, West 46th Street, Manhattan; Waterways: Poetry in the Mainstream readings and book fairs; the American Indian Community House; Poets House; and many other venues.

Kenny held residencies at a number of colleges and universities, including St. Lawrence University (which granted him an honorary doctorate in 1995), the American Indian Community House in New York City, the Oneida Nation in Wisconsin, the University of California, Berkeley, the En'owkin Center, the University of Oklahoma, and Syracuse Community Writers (funded by the New York State Council on the Arts).

== Awards and honors ==
- In 2014, the Empire State Center for the Book of the New York State Library inducted Kenny into the New York Writers Hall of Fame.
- In 2002, he received the Lifetime Achievement Award from the Native Writers' Circle of the Americas.
- In 2000, the Wordcraft Circle of Native Writers awarded Kenny the Elder Recognition Award.
- In 1995, he received an honorary doctorate from St. Lawrence University.
- In 1984, The Mama Poems received the American Book Award from the Before Columbus Foundation.
- In 1983, Wounds Beneath the Flesh received Bloomsbury Review's award for best anthology.
- Kenny received a National Public Radio Award for Broadcasting for a radio production of his poem "Dug-Out."

=== Nominations ===
- In 1996, On Second Thought (book)|On Second Thought was a finalist for the Oklahoma Book Award in fiction.
- Kenny was twice nominated for the Pulitzer Prize, for his book Blackrobe: Isaac Jogues and the collection Between Two Rivers.

== Poetry ==
- The Hopeless Kill, Watertown Daily Times (1956)
- Dead Letters Sent, and Other Poems, Troubadour Press (1958)
- With Love to Lesbia, Aardvark Press (1959)
- And Grieve, Lesbia, Aardvark Press (1960)
- North: Poems of Home, Blue Cloud Quarterly (1977)
- Only As Far As Brooklyn, Good Gay Poets Press (1979)
- I Am The Sun, White Pine Press (1979)
- Dancing Back Strong the Nation: Poems by Maurice Kenny, with an introduction by [Paula Gunn Allen], White Pine Press (1981)
- Kneading the Blood, Strawberry Press (1981)
- Blackrobe: Isaac Jogues, b. March 11, 1607, d. October 18, 1646: Poems, North Country Community College Press (1982)
- Boston Tea Party, Soup Press (1982)
- The Smell of Slaughter, Blue Cloud Quarterly (1982)
- Wounds Beneath the Flesh (1983)
- The Mama Poems, White Pine Press (1st ed. 1984, 2nd ed. 2008)
- Is Summer This Bear, Chauncy Press (1985)
- Between Two Rivers: Selected Poems, 1956-1984, White Pine Press (1985)
- Greyhounding This America: Poems and Dialog by Maurice Kenny, Heidelberg Graphics (1988)
- Humors And/Or Not So Humorous, Swift Kick Press (1988)
- The Short and the Long of It, University of Arkansas Press (1990)
- Last Mornings in Brooklyn, Point Riders Press (1991)
- Tekonwatonti: Molly Brant (1735-1795): Poems of War, White Pine Press (1st ed. 1992, 2nd ed. 2008)
- On Second Thought: A Compilation, University of Oklahoma Press (1995)
- In the Time of the Present: New Poems, Michigan State University Press (2000)
- Carving Hawk: New and Selected Poems, 1956-2000, White Pine Press (2005)
- Connotations, White Pine Press (2008)
- Feeding Bears, Many Moons Press (2010)
- Saranac Lake Ghost Poems, Ghost City Press (2016)
- Monahsetah, Resistance, and Other Markings on Turtle’s Back, Mongrel Empire (2017)
- Wild Daisies from the Side of the Road: A Collective Tribute to Maurice Kenny, Many Moons Press (2018)

== Prose ==
- Rain and Other Fictions, White Pine (1991)
- Backward to Forward: Prose Pieces, White Pine (1997)
- Tortured Skins and Other Fictions, Michigan State University Press (2000)
- Angry Rain: A Memoir, State University of New York Press (October 2018)
