= Waterways: Poetry in the Mainstream =

The Waterways Project of Ten Penny Players and the related Bard Press has published both established and emerging poets. The literary magazine, Waterways: Poetry in the Mainstream, has been in continuous publication since 1979. For thirty years, Waterways and Ten Penny Players worked with special needs and incarcerated children in New York City schools.

== Literary Magazine ==
The Waterways Project began as part of the vibrant, populist poetry scene of the 1970s and 1980s. Waterways: Poetry in the Mainstream, has published such critically acclaimed poets early in their careers as Lyn Lifshin, Rochelle Ratner, Richard Kostelanetz, Cornelius Eady, Joan Larkin, and Will Inman. Culturally and ethnically diverse poets from across the United States have appeared in the magazine. These include Albert Huffstickler, Maurice Kenny, Ida Fasel, Sandra Maria Esteves, James Penha, Lester Afflick, Rose Sher, and Magdalena Gomez. The magazine also published the work of New York poets Barbara A. Holland, Bob Holman, Emilie Glen, Carol Polcovar, Pedro Pietri, Donald Lev and Enid Dame. In June 1980, the magazine changed its name from The Waterways Project to Waterways: Poetry in the Mainstream.

Waterways’ publishers Barbara Fisher and Richard Spiegel began the magazine in 1979. It has been continually published on a monthly basis in chapbook form for 32 years.

== Book Fairs ==
In New York City, The Waterways Project was in the forefront of organizing poetry readings and small press book fairs. The first Waterways poetry reading and book fair was held at the South Street Seaport Museum on July 4, 1979.

“The New York State Waterways Project grew out of a desire to present the artistry of the word in a novel setting. The waterways caught our imagination from a concern for aesthetics and the ecology of New York rivers and lakes.”

From March through August 1980 Waterways presented the "American Populist Poetry Series." 20th-century poets were paired with 19th-century poets of their choice. It included: Harry Smith/Herman Melville, Joan Larkin/Emily Dickinson, Zizwe Ngafua/Paul Laurence Dunbar, Enid Dame/Adah Isaacs Menken, Maurice Kenny/Pauline Johnson, Richard Davidson/Walt Whitman, Ellen Marie Bissert/Alice Carey, and Donald Lev/Edgar Allan Poe. The series began at the Seaport with letterpress publications prepared by Bowne and Company. Don Lev's reading was moved to the Jefferson Market Branch of the New York Public Library. These readings were published in Waterways: Poetry in the Mainstream, Volume 1, number 1.

For two years, a series of Waterways book fairs promoted the work of literary presses and individual poets. Among these presses were Louis Reyes Rivera’s Shamal Books, 13th Moon, edited by Marilyn Hacker and Ellen Marie Bissert, Stanley and Beebee Barkan’s Cross-Cultural Communications, and Virginia Scott's Sunbury Press. Others included Abraham Marinoff Books, American Book Review, Contact/II, East River Review, Helen Review, Home Planet News, Ithaca House, Strawberry Press, Swamp Press, and chapbooks by Paul Johnston.

In 1980, Waterways published poets who read at the New York Small Press Book Fair held at New York University's Loeb Student Center, and at the Cedar Tavern and Cornelia Street Cafe. Poets Patty Mucha, Safiya, Marie Ponsot, Jan Castro, Zack Rogow, Lucy Anglieri, Alison Colbert, Jeff Wright, Elizabeth Marraffino, Michael Horowitz, and Ron Welburn were among those who participated. This issue contains a history of the Small Press Book Fair by Richard Spiegel, from its inception in 1974.

This program was started with a grant from the National Endowment for the Arts. After several years, the series moved into the public libraries. Richard Spiegel developed poetry workshops at the Jefferson Market Library, and facilitated them from 1982 to 1995. This workshop continued to the present (2012).

== Arts Education for Special Needs Children ==
Richard Kostelanetz wrote in the Summer 2000 issue of Home Planet News, “The greatest social theme of our time is the empowerment of those previously regarded as powerless. Familiarly, this development changed the lives of African-Americans and women. Less familiar are changes that have happened in both education and publishing.” He continued, “The great achievement of the Waterways Project was extending this laudable principle and the opportunities it implied to the New York City public schools.” Waterways works “mostly not with the ‘star’ city students at the academically famous high schools but with those at ‘vocational’ and ‘alternative’ institutions, including those imprisoned.”

Waterways developed a school program for children with disabilities in 1982, and became involved in bringing art education to children in hospitals, schools, prisons and other sites. Waterways partnered with the New York City Vocational Training Center, the Brooklyn Literacy Center (Frederick Douglass) and Island Academy on Rikers Island to develop an arts based literacy program. This was developed at the NYC Office of Alternative High Schools and Programs and was funded by the Center. Consulting artists such as Liza Jessie Peterson, Ellen Lyttle, and Molly Barker participated in the program. Fielding Dawson, Louis Reyes Rivera, Hal Sirowitz, Enid Dame, Odimumba Kwamdela and other poets conducted classes with the students. At one time there were forty teaching artists as consultants.

The Austin H. McCormick Island Academy at Rikers Island Prison, opening in the fall of 1985, was the first high school in a United States correctional facility. The dedication ceremony was in May 1986. Mel Cohen, a special education instructor and musician, and Richard Spiegel, poet and co-director of Ten Penny Players/Waterways, were the first onsite Waterways teachers. Waterways printed chapbooks of the students' poetry, and poets Zoë Anglesey, Pedro Pietri, and others came in to work with the incarcerated students.

In 1987, Waterways began receiving funding from the New York State Council on the Arts. The Rikers Island Educational Facility (RIEF) began in 1988 and Matthew Hejna was its first Waterways teacher. The same year, the Rose M. Singer women's center at Rikers Island started Rosewood High School. Ronald G. King, a poet, became the Waterways instructor there. Before 2000, all three programs were combined into one school.

Besides emphasizing writing and publishing chapbooks of students’ work, Ten Penny Players/Waterways has partnered with other kinds of artists and worked with the arts coordinator for the Austin H. MacCormick Island Academy.

In 2005, Waterways was given a credit in the film, “Rikers High,” a documentary about the prison school.

Beginning in 1981, with "In Search of a Song." and continuing to 2005, Waterways published 982 individual limited edition chapbooks for students attending NYC Alternative High Schools and Programs. In 2007-2008, a new curriculum was created, using pets, poetry and photographs to motivate creative expression. This was described in Reprising Joy: In Search of a Song, by Barbara Fisher, in 2009.

== BardPress ==
Richard Alan Spiegel's BardPress began publishing poetry chapbooks in 1974.

They include:

A Mystic Country She Never Believed In, by Enid Dame

The Gentleman from Hyde Park, by Richard Davidson

Death of a Man, by Richard Davidson

Basic, by Ida Fasel

Survivors and Other Poems, by Ilsa Gilbert

Melusine Discovered, by Barbara A. Holland

Soul Gallery, by Albert Huffstickler

The Eye of the Cat, by Matthew Laufer

Grief, by Donald Lev

Labyrinthiad, by Clint McCown

The Other Side of the Moon, by Joy Hewitt Mann

Aria, by Lydia Raurell

Inside Invisible Walls, by Joanne Seltzer

A Voice For My Grandmother, by Ron Singer

Lilith, by Patricia Kelly

== Awards ==
Their programs received awards from The Mayor's Very Special Arts (Mayor Dinkins), The Pace Promise of Learning, and the Office of Alternative High Schools and Programs. In 2003 Barbara Fisher and Richard Spiegel received the Association of Teaching Artists' "Teaching Artist Distinguished Service to The Arts In Education Field Award."

In 2003 Ten Penny Players received a Council on the Arts & Humanities of Staten Island’s Achievement in the Arts & Humanities Award. "Ten Penny Players is the lead arts partner for the Austin H. MacCormick Island Academy on Rikers Island, the New York City Vocational Training Center (with four sites on Staten Island including one at the College of Staten Island), and the New Visions High School for Contemporary Arts in the Bronx. Ten Penny Players coordinates the Consortium for Alternative Literacy, which is a city wide network of schools and arts agencies."
