= Container port design process =

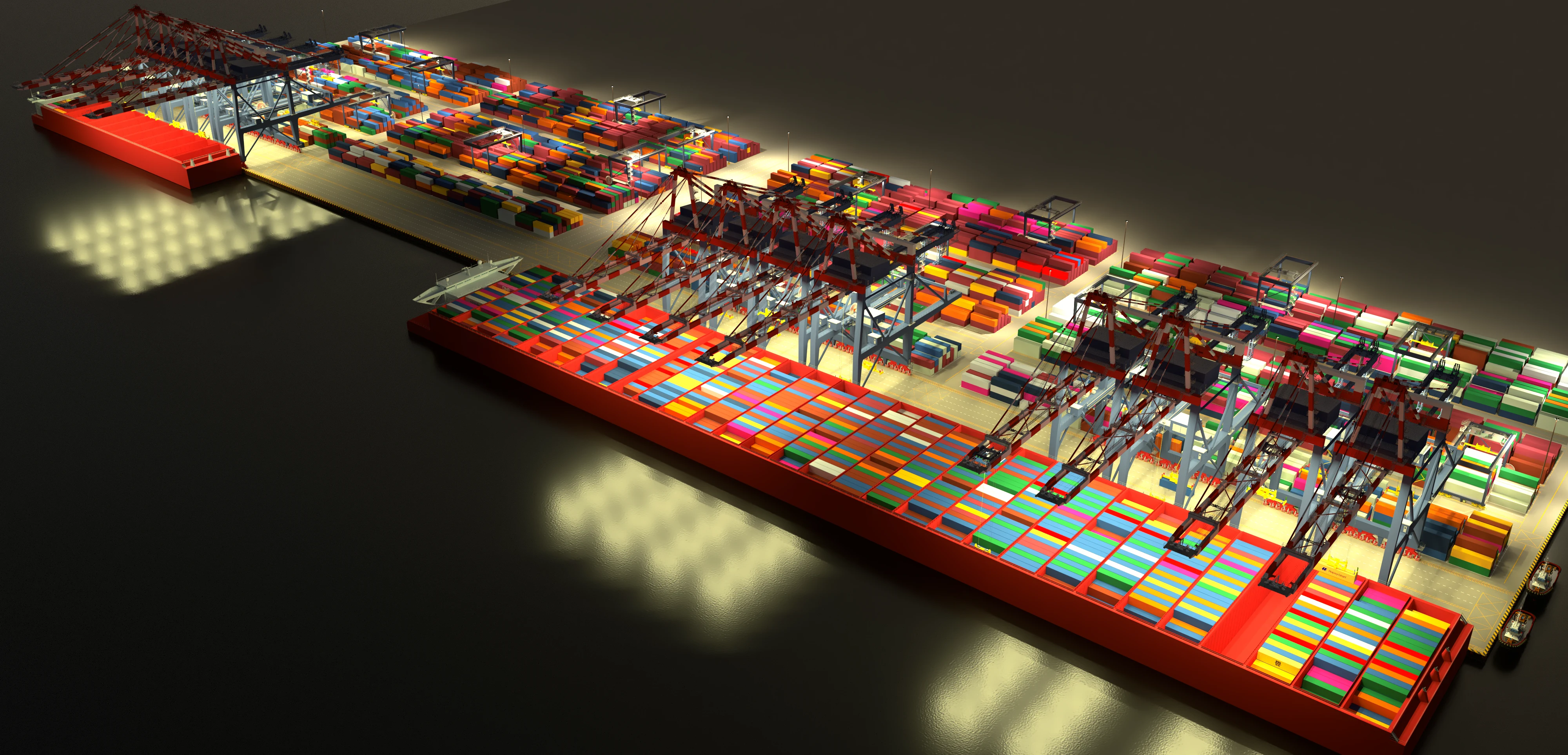
Container on barge port

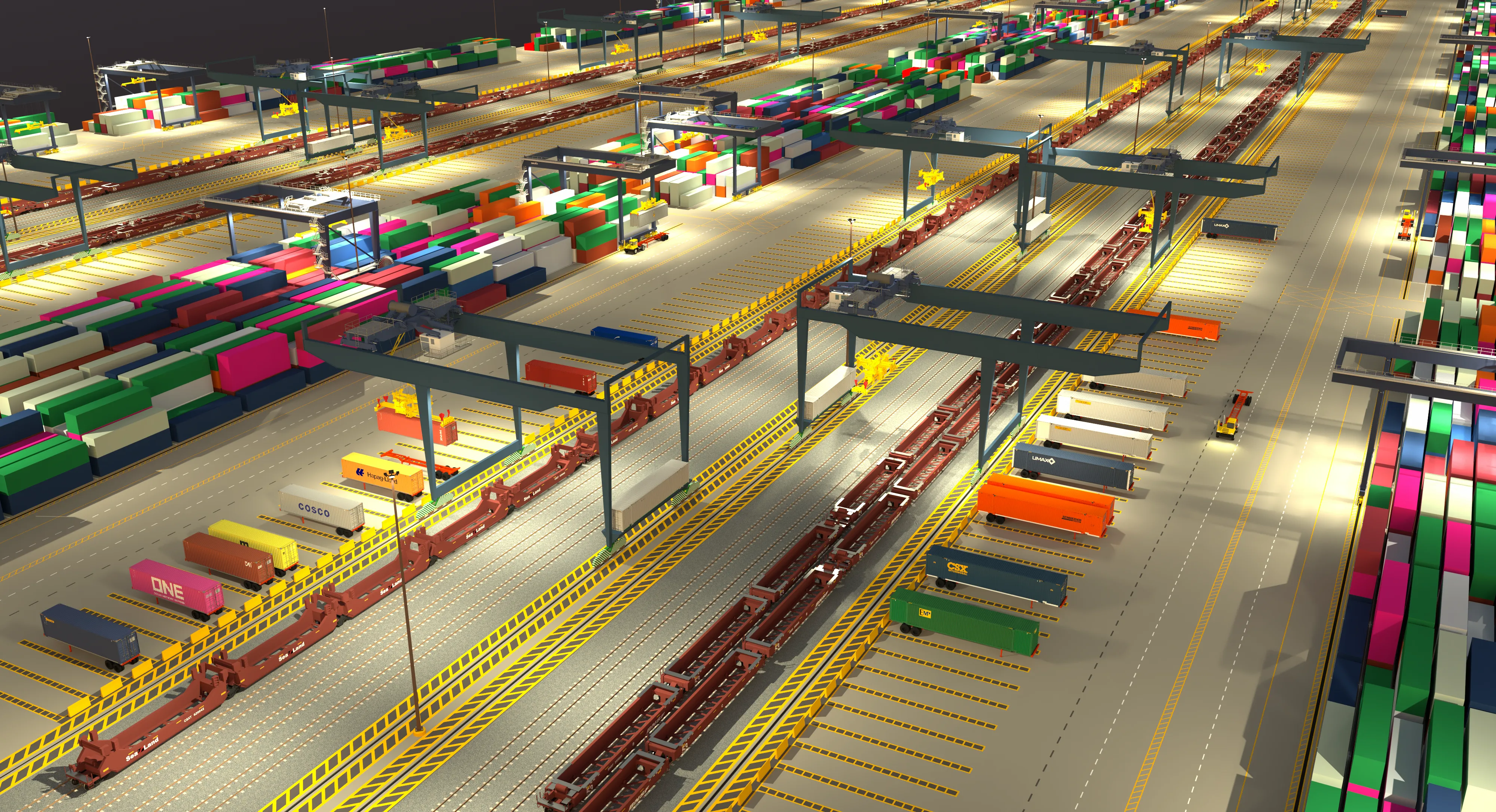
Intermodal terminal

3D conceptual designs using SketchUp and rendered with V-Ray

Container port design process is a set of correlated practices considered during container port design, aiming to transfer general business mission into detailed design documents for future construction and operation.

The design process involves both conceptual design and detailed design.

== Funding ==
The source of funding determines the mission and scope of the project. Choices include federal funding (subsidies), state or local funding, and private funding.

American ports require subsidies from the federal government in order to keep up with advances in maritime transportation as well as the capabilities of the inland freight movement. Often, roughly 50% of the costs every year come from federal sources. The American Association of Port Authorities (AAPA) is an association that aims at ensuring and increasing federal funds to American ports.

A few federal bills which provide funding for ports are

- Fixing America's Surface Transportation (FAST) Act: $11 billion in funding to assist in surface transportation improvements
- National Highway Freight Program (NHFP): at least $10 billion in funding reorganized for more efficient use in transportation improvements

Most often, the State's Department of Transportation (DOT) is the largest state/local financier of public money investments. The DOTs see the ports as key elements in the systems of movement they are responsible for, such as railways and highways.

Investment from private entities is critical to the creation and execution of port activities. American ports are often run by private entities in the sense that day-to-day functions are financed and managed with the primary goal of creating revenue. The municipalities of the terminals are kept up by the Port Authority, but the equipment and infrastructure required for operations are under the private entities' power.

With the creation of new ports, often Public-Private Partnerships, otherwise known as 3P, are formed to bring in the upfront capital necessary for someone to take on the financial risk of operating a terminal. Container terminals are no different in this sense from other types of terminals.

== Cargo ==
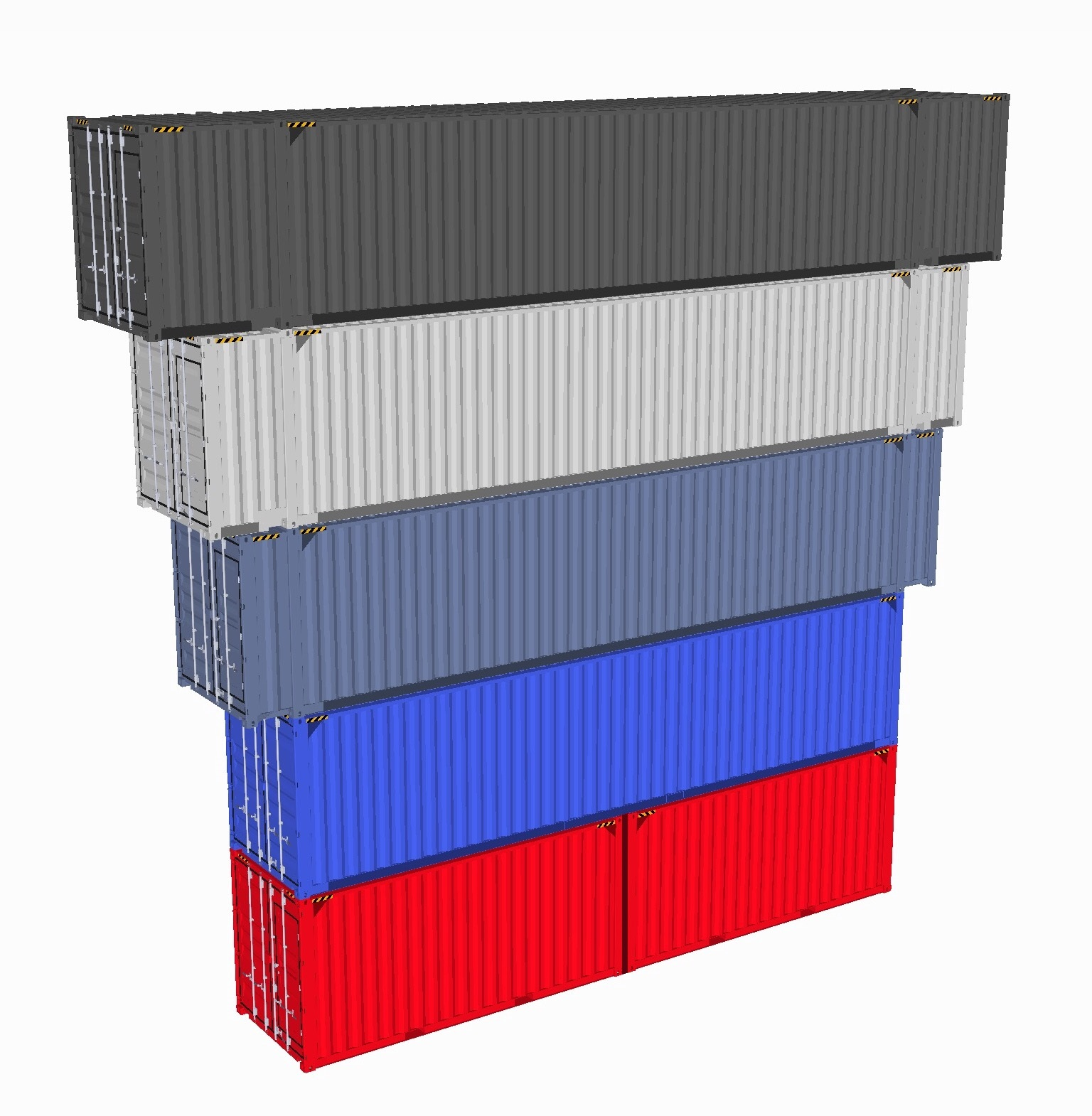
Container types in consideration

Cargo determines the main function, transportation mode, and related characters required for the container port. In container port design, the object cargo is an intermodal container. Containers are usually classified as 20-foot and 40-foot. 53-foot containers were introduced and used both in the US and Canada, mainly for domestic road and rail transport.

== Vessels ==
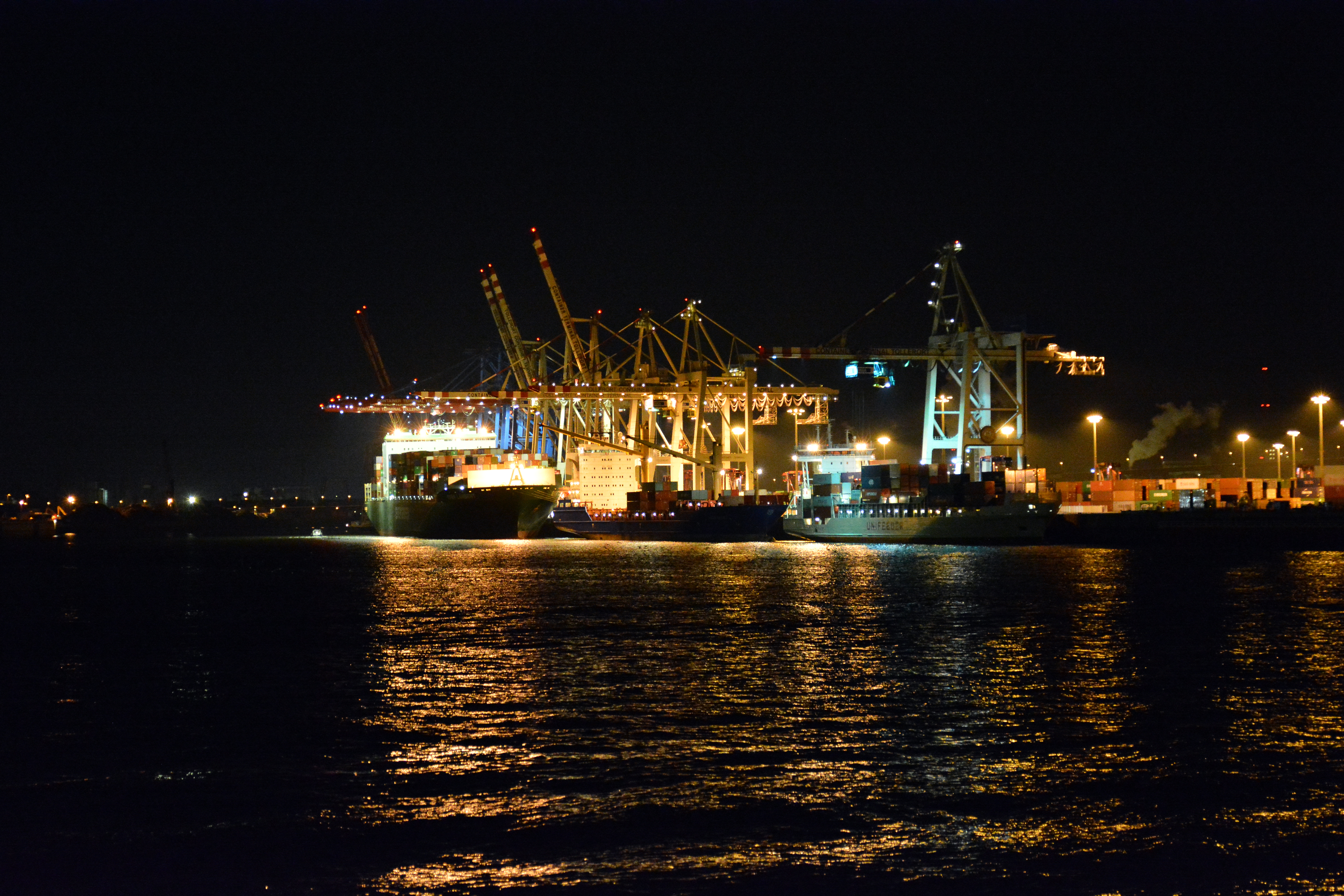
Container Vessel in Different size

The type of vessel, its dimension, and capacity determine the required capacity for a port's input capacity, which involves berth design, water-borne handling equipment selection, and requirements for both storage and land-mode capacity.

The characteristics of vessels and the port characteristics:

- Main dimensions:
  - length, which determines the widths and bends of the channel, size required for the terminal, and maximum number of berths;
  - the breadth and air draft, which influences cargo-handing equipment selection, and the width of channels;
  - draft, which determines the depth along berths.
- Cargo Capacity, which control over the cargo ship requirements (minimum) of storage, and can affect the loading and unloading processing, usually cranes/ship.
- Designed vessel Function. Whether vessel has cargo handling equipment/ how it load cargo. Usually, container vessels require external handling equipment.
- Vessel routine shall also get considered as the inter-modal capability requirement for import, export, and trans-ship service will be different.

The selection of designed vessel shall also consider the development of the container ship. Underestimating the trend of size development of container ship will result in incapability and low sustainability.

== Location ==
3BL principle for container port design

It should start with data collection and get finished by receiving government permits. The choice of location is considered with the philosophy of triple-bottom line and with considerations of waterside access, natural conditions, inter-modal connections, and stakeholders.

For ports

- Promotion of the advanced development of the urban and regional economy;
- The requirement of vessel's maneuvering, braking, harbor navigation, berthing operations;
- Greenfield site for general port development, such as new quays, reclamation, or breakwater.

For container terminals

- The availability of deep water;
- The environmental site conditions including oceanographic and meteorological conditions;
- The availability of land;
- Good inland transport link or intermodal connections;
- The soil conditions

=== Waterside Access ===
Waterside access is the condition of waterways in the location, which determines the expected depth, berth quantities, vessel accessibility, and effort required for the development. The access channel is a waterway that linking the basins of a port to the open sea. The importance of the location of access channels is that it determines the oceanographic factors such as wave, tidal cycle, current, wind met by the ships in the channel. Also, it needs to keep the depth of the channel and be able to accommodate the world's largest cargo vessels. For example, in order to meet the need, the Port Authority of New York and New Jersey runs the Main Navigation Channel Deepening Program, dredged 38 miles of federal channels to as deep as 50 feet by 30 years. There are several aspects, based on PIANC (1997), a designer needs to consider:

1. Vessel's dimension and velocity;
2. The cargo hazard level;
3. The traffic density;
4. The physical environmental conditions are consisting of wind, waves, currents, tidal range, as well as the hardness of the bottom surface.

=== Natural conditions ===
Natural conditions are classified as to whether the area selected is developed or natural. Natural condition determines whether there will be existing utilities and constraint for future terminal development.

Category		Project			
Geology	Soil Type	Sand	Clay	Sedimentary soil	Rock
Geology	Bedrock Depth	Bedrock elevation	Bedrock properties		
Geology	Soil Properties	Soil texture	Soil structure	Soil porosity	
Meteorological	Wind	Wind velocity	Wind direction		
Meteorological	Hurricane	Passing frequency	Route	level	degree of damage
Meteorological	Other	Temperature	Precipitation	Visibility on fog	
Oceanography	Tide	Tide type	Tide position	Salinity	
Oceanography	Current	Residual current	Velocity		
Oceanography	Water level	Sea level rise			

=== Intermodal connections ===
An intermodal connection is a place where rail, truck, barge, and other transport methods converge. Intermodal connection for container terminal mainly consists of road and rail. The capacity of intermodal connection---docking and the handling, storage, and transfer of cargo---determines the capability of terminal cargo transportation to/from the land.

== Stakeholders ==
Stakeholders as any group or individual who can affect or is affected by the achievement of the organization's objectives. (R. Edward Freeman 1984.) Stakeholder analysis is a process of systematically gathering and analyzing qualitative information to determine whose interests should be taken into account when developing and or implementing a policy or program. The purpose of a stakeholder analysis is to assess the attitudes of the stakeholders regarding the realization of a new container terminal.

Stakeholders in location selection mainly consist of trade organizations, maritime groups, regional government, neighborhood societies, environment groups, and other people with direct/indirect interest related to the terminal. Selection shall involve their participation so as to avoid strong conflicts in future development and to keep terminal development adapt to the changing demand from these stakeholders.

Agencies and societies involved in this process are:

1. Port Authority
2. Municipality
3. Province
4. National Government
5. Residents
6. Potential Operators
7. Environmentalist

== Permits ==
Permits are crucial in the designing process. Large scale development projects that have the potential for causing significant adverse environmental impacts need permits to start operation. Projects without permits will be identified as an offense. Port needs port permits to open. Environmental permits will be issued by Local Environmental Protection Agencies. Usually include three-part: water side, land side, and air emissions. Permits for ports should include a clean air permit, construction permit, discharge permit, dredge permits, and water discharge permit.

== Detailed design ==
The consideration of infrastructure includes plans for deployment and construction of infrastructures to implement the functions of the terminal. The wharf at a terminal is the structure that forms the edge of the landside facility. It is made up of both the topside and the face. The face of the wharf is where equipment is mounted to allow vessels to berth. It is also designed to be within the high water levels, thus making its structures susceptible to corrosion. Water-tightness and corrosion protection are a must for any structural elements that make up the face. The topside of the wharf is what is broken down into berths. Pre-designated lengths of the wharf are separated into identified berths based on the design vessels characteristics. Container cranes operate along the wharf when vessels have berthed.

Warehouses are created at container terminals to hold specific goods that are transported to the port but are not being shipped out in the same container. This style of transport is not common. However, this can be a service supplied by the terminal owners to increase imports. Those goods, when warehoused, incur additional handling and storage costs, increasing revenue as well.

Maintenance is the conception that uses engineering theories and practices, risk management, and maintenance strategy to plan and implement routine maintenance of facilities and operation systems. The overall maintenance policy for port or terminal should be to maintain all of the facility assets to the extent that the level of expenditure is justified in order that the assets remain serviceable during their design life or longer and for reasons of safety and security. A typical maintenance team involves experienced personnel under the control of a qualified engineering maintenance manager and supervisory staff, and engineering inspection staff. It should meet the requirements listed in ISM (International Safety Management Code). The maintenance facilities required will include a workshop with sufficient space to work on approximately 10% of the mobile equipment and spreaders at any one time. The maintenance facilities should be located outside but close to the container yard. It is necessary to provide a Stores section within the maintenance facility that will hold necessary spare components and materials. Following are the specific requirements for maintenance.

Planned preventive maintenance and statutory inspections of equipment are normally carried out during the day shift when all specialist trades are available. Outside of the day shift, minimal manning levels are normally retained to cover breakdowns and emergency repairs only. For other specialist areas such as IT and electronics, it is usual to retain specialized personnel due to the specific needs of such systems and equipment. Mechanical and electrical engineering and IT personnel will be responsible for the daily maintenance of cargo handling equipment and other aspects of the facility that require these skills and for specific IT operating systems such as the TOS. High voltage electrical cables and switchgear should be maintained by specialist contractors whilst maintenance of low and medium cables and domestic electrics can be undertaken by electrical tradesmen.

A lay-down area is the space where container handling equipment places full or empty containers prior to loading onto the containers' next step in its journey to its destination. The lay-down area is composed of multiple structural layers to support the loads brought on by the equipment and cargo. The first layer, the foundation, consists of either the existing or improved subgrade of the location. To add extra strength to the foundation, the existing soils are compacted; further, Soil Improvements such as stone columns are installed, or the unsatisfactory soils are removed and a new fill soil is brought in, graded, and compacted to meet requirements.

The second layer is asphalt paving. This pavement differs from the typical highway and road pavement as the loads are generally more stationary as well as much smaller in magnitude. This type of pavement contains Hydraulically Bound Materials (HBM), an ingredient used to provide higher compressive strength to the asphalt. The mixture is the first part of designing the asphalt, with the second being the thickness. Both the materials and the thickness can be calculated by following existing design guides published by engineering societies. The World Association for Waterborne Transport Infrastructure's (PIANC) Report 165-2015 can provide further guidance on container terminal pavements.

The lay-down area surface is also designed for multiple functions. The pavement must drain towards a drainage system as well as have a sufficient grip to prevent skidding. Finally, the pavement is painted to show lanes for travel as well as rows to place Intermodal container containers when not in transit.

Intermodal yards mainly consist of two parts, rail yards, and container storage yards. Rail yards should have access to rails, and container storage yards should have access to trucks. Container storage yards include yards for inbound containers with cargo and internal movements, yards for outbound containers with cargo, yards for trans-shipment containers, and yards for empties. The area requirements are measured in TEU ground slots (the area required for one 20-ft container) plus operating space for equipment that transfers containers to and from the yards and stack and deliver containers.

== Port security ==
Port security consists of cargo security, port facility security, staff security, and maritime domain security. Port security should be worked jointly by the coast guards and custom and border protection together. Internationally, port security is governed by rules issued by the International Maritime Organization and its 2002 International Ship and Port Facility Security Code.

During the design process, ports need to come up with a port security plan and implement it. The port security plan should include security survey and risk assessment, physical security and access control, information security, personnel security, maritime terrorism, drug smuggling, stowaways and alien smuggling, roles/ responsibilities/ legal authorities of port agencies, sea robbery, cargo security, and hazardous materials and intelligence.

== Customs facility ==
Customs should have both base offices at the warehouse and around the gates. The office at the warehouse is mainly for detecting harmful agriculture and smuggling (drugs, dirty money). Office at gates is mainly for the reason of detecting mis-picked cargo or radiation containers. At gates, there should be radiation-detection equipment aim at detecting dangerous weapons and radiation stuff that can be used to make dirty bombs. Radiation Portal Monitors (RPMs) are passive radiation detection devices used for the screening of individuals, vehicles, cargo, or other vectors for the detection of illicit sources such as at borders or secure facilities. Portal VACIS imaging system helps trained operators see the contents of closed containers, assisting them in intercepting weapons, contraband, and other items of interest and verifying shipping manifests. Patented drive-through technology lets trucks drive through the system without stopping, providing an effective solution for high-traffic situations where lengthy manual inspection processes are impractical or undesirable.

== Mooring ==
Mooring (watercraft) infrastructure at a port describes those structures that mooring lines from vessels can tie off to in order to prevent drifting along or away from the wharf face. The mooring structures are called cleat (nautical) or bollards, depending on their size and shape. Bollards are designed to handle much larger loads, and in turn, much larger vessels. Manufacturers of these items typically design the items and supply the finished design to the consultant to include in the bid documents.

Cleats and bollards can be found on all different forms of structures. The common one is the wharf face of a terminal. Other locations can include dolphins, which are stand-alone structures that are off the face of the landside infrastructure. Another source can be other barges or sea vessels allowing vessels to tie off to each other.

Bollards and cleats can have multiple types of mooring lines tied off to them. Bow and stern lines, found at the front and the back of the vessel, are lines designed to prevent vessels from drifting perpendicular to the berth location. Breast lines come from closer to the centerline of the vessel and span along the vessel to the mooring location to keep the vessel from drifting parallel to the berth. PIANC Report _______ can provide further details on the design of mooring structures. Bollard and cleat manufacturers can provide more details on dimensions, weights, and capacities of mooring structures

== Berthing ==
Berthing of the vessels is analyzed using the design vessel's characteristics of weight, draught, and other specifications in addition to the requirements set by the terminal location such as wind speeds, direction, currents, and safe berthing velocities of the approach channel and berth. All these factors come together to determine the maximum amounts of energy that must be resisted by the terminal foundation and wharf. Multiple styles of berthing equipment have been designed in response to this requirement.

Container terminals are, for the most part, directly on land, eliminating the need for berthing dolphins similar to those described in the Mooring section. Fender systems installed on the wharf face are the main facility for reducing the amount of energy the wharf structure must absorb during berthing. A fender system consists of the fender (boating) itself, the panel, and the various hardware required to anchor and stabilize the unit.

Fenders are made of a grade of rubber chosen for their flexibility. The more compressible, the more energy the fender can resist. They come in multiple sizes and shapes, aimed at handling different situations. Fenders do not need to be mounted in the same location at all times. Some fenders are designed to rise and fall with water levels.

Panels are large faces that connect to the fender giving more contact space for the vessel. The size also helps reduce the reaction on the vessel's hull, which is designed for a certain maximum pressure. They are often covered with a friction-reducing surface to prevent lateral forces trying to shear the fender apart. One final element of panel design is associated not just with its dimensions but with its location relative to another fender. The spacing of the fenders relative to the size of the panel must be set so that the design vessel cannot compress the fender in an angled situation and contact the wharf. Either a second fender panel must be contacted, or the fender cannot compress too much in an unsymmetrical fashion.

The structural elements of a fender system must be analyzed to ensure the equilibrium and stability of each unit at all times. Chains are installed to keep the panel from putting unnecessary shear due to vessel action or weight of the panel. Also, anchors are installed into the wharf to anchor the fender to the wharf face. At these locations, the foundation of the terminal is strengthened more so than at areas of non-contact due to the larger forces imparted on the structure.

Container quay crane rails

Container storage yards

Cargo berths

Pavements

== Communication ==
Communication is very important in ports because ports are areas with high risks; by good communication, people can avoid risks. In the design process, people should consider adding more base stations to ensure good quality of radio contact and video contact. The customs officers should have both radio contact and video contact with truck drivers driving through the gate to make sure they have picked up the right container. Pilots in the port should have good radio communications to guide them sailing. Port laborers should have good communication through radio with each other to avoid conflicts and risks.

== Equipment ==
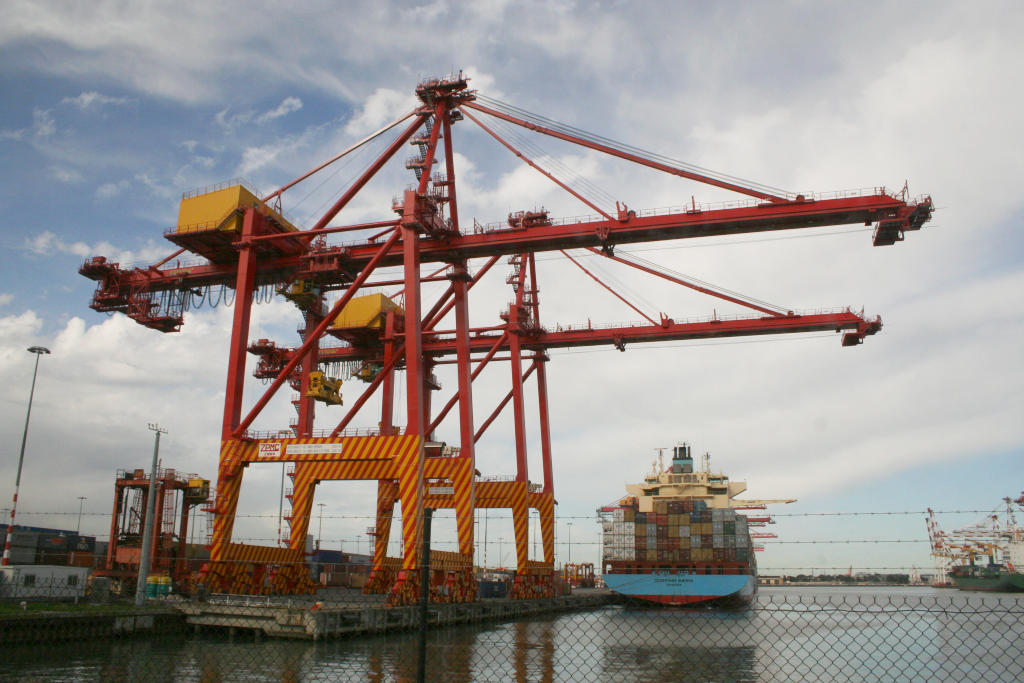
waterside container crane in container terminal

The consideration of equipment includes plans for procurement and construction of terminal facilities to implement the function of the terminal. Equipment involved in the detailed design includes container cranes which can be identified by mode: Rail Mounted Quay Crane (RMQC) or Ship to Shore (STS) Crane; and inter-modal container transport facilities used for storage areas such as Reach Stackers, Tractor-Trailer Units (TTUs) and Vehicles. Parameters for cranes and inter-modal cargo transport facilities considered in detailed design are quantities, size limit, power requirement, handling capacity, handling speed, cost, load to land limit, and other working environment constraints.

The deployment of equipment shall be designed with a key mission to create enough cargo transportation to balance the cargo flow. Queueing theory shall be introduced to the quantity and quality of equipment required.

== Security clearance ==
Some staff, such as coast guards or customs, need personal security clearances to obtain a job at ports because they need to have access to classified information. There are three levels of security clearance, confidential, secret, and top secret. A critical investigation in it is a background investigation of a face-to-face interview with officers. Sometimes staff just need to get an interim security clearance. There will also be a periodic reinvestigation every 5 years to obtain a new security clearance. The investigation will again cover key aspects of the individual's life but will start from one's previous background investigation.

=== Labors ===
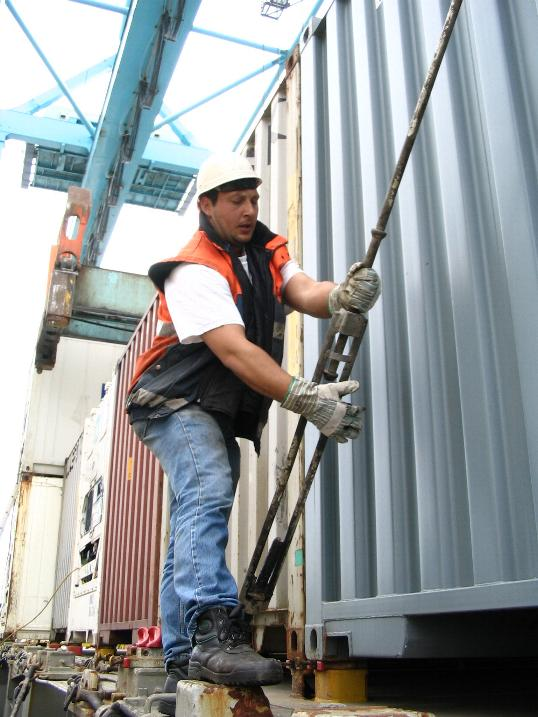
container terminal worker

In the ports, operating systems and personnel development are based on skills acquired through experience, which is easily undertaken in advanced industrial environments.

Several agreements we should take into account:

- ILO code of practice --- Safety and Health in ports; (2003)
- ILO code of practice --- Security in ports; (2004)

=== Safety and security ===
Safety is the condition of a "steady state" of an organization or place. Security is the process or means, physical or human, of delaying, preventing, and otherwise protecting against external or internal defects, dangers, loss, criminals, and other individuals or actions. The main documents related to terminal operations are the ILO convention 152 (1979) and the ILO code of practice (2003) which cope with the health and safety of port labor.

=== Logistics ===
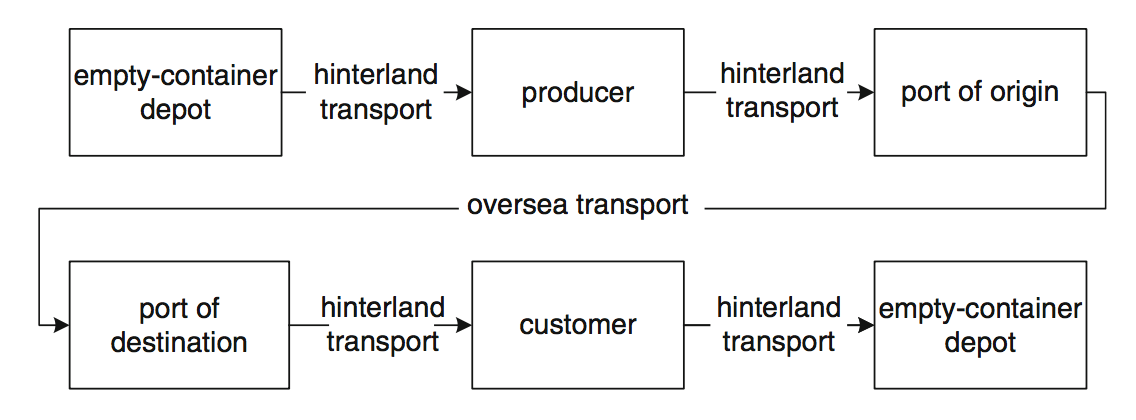
Schematic container-transport chain.png

Logistics is the general supply chain of how resources are acquired, stored and transported to their final destination. It involves identifying prospective distributors and suppliers and determining their effectiveness and accessibility.

=== Customs ===
Customs and Border Protection exists to a safeguard country's borders, thereby protecting the public from dangerous people and materials while enhancing the nation's global economic competitiveness by enabling legitimate trade and travel. Customs at ports of entry have two main tasks: cargo security and protecting agriculture. Every port should have its own nation's customs. They should have base offices both at the administration building and the warehouse (check agriculture) and outside offices at both the entry gates, leaving gates. Groups of customs at the port should be consisted of Marine Interdiction Agents, Border Patrol Agents, Agriculture Specialists, Custom and Border Protection Officers, and Import Specialists.

== See also ==
- Design
- Subsidy
- Business Plan
- Container port
- Strategic planning
- Queueing theory
- Triple bottom line
- World Association for Waterborne Transport Infrastructure
- Container ship
- Intermodal container
- Container crane
- Port security
- Mode of transport
- Funding
