= Mark Afflick =

Australian rugby league footballer

Personal information
- Full name: Mark Afflick
- Born: 2 May 1970 (age 55)

Playing information
- Position: Prop, Second-row
Club
Years	Team	Pld	T	G	FG	P
1990–92	Balmain Tigers	13	0	0	0	0
1993–96	Western Suburbs	31	0	0	0	0
	Total	44	0	0	0	0
- Source: As of 16 December 2022

Mark Afflick is an Australian former professional rugby league footballer who played in the 1990s. He played for Balmain and Western Suburbs in the NSWRL competition.

== Playing career ==
Afflick made his first grade debut for Balmain in round 14 of the 1990 NSWRL season against South Sydney. Afflick played off the bench in the 44–10 victory at Leichhardt Oval. In 1993, Afflick joined Western Suburbs and played 31 games for the club before being released at the end of the 1996 ARL season.
