= The Waterways Journal Weekly =

- Categories: Trade magazine
- Frequency: Weekly
- Founded: 1887
- Company: The Waterways Journal Inc.
- Country: United States
- Based in: St. Louis, Missouri
- Language: English
- Website: www.waterwaysjournal.net
- ISSN: 0043-1524

The Waterways Journal Weekly is the news journal of record for the towing and barge industry on the inland waterways of the United States, chiefly the watershed of the Mississippi River and its tributaries and the Gulf Intracoastal Waterway. Known as The Riverman’s Bible, the periodical has been published continuously from St. Louis, Missouri, since 1887. Published by H. Nelson Spencer and his son Nelson Spencer Jr., it is the only American maritime publication that focuses exclusively on the inland waterways of the United States, and is one of the few remaining family-owned, advertiser-supported trade weeklies of any description.

== Features ==
One of the magazine’s most popular features is a river-history column called the Old Boat Column that runs each week, generally on the third to last page. The Old Boat Column is of particular interest to non-specialist readers with a general interest in the history of the inland waterways. The column was written for decades by James V. Swift (1916–2002) who worked for The Waterways Journal in various capacities for 60 years. After Swift, River Hall of Fame recipient and boat architect Alan L. Bates wrote the column for many years until his death on New Year's Day, 2012 and then by Keith Norrington, director/curator of the Howard Steamboat Museum in Jeffersonville, Indiana, from 2012 to 2022. Since then the column has been written by Capt. David Smith.

The publication’s wide-ranging news articles provide a window into the people and technology behind a robust major sector of industrial transport in the United States. Topics covered include towboat launches and christenings, inland shipyards, lock and dam construction, marine salvage, admiralty law, the Army Corps of Engineers, dredging news, inland ports and terminals, barge and towboat construction and launches, new technology relating to towboats, and regulations of the U.S. Coast Guard, Environmental Protection Agency, and other federal agencies that affect inland waterways commerce, as well as news about major commodities that travel the waterways, such as grain, coal, steel and fertilizer.

The Waterways Journal also closely cover the actions of organizations that support waterways interests, including the Waterways Council Inc. (WCI), the American Waterways Operators (AWO), National Waterways Conference, Inland Rivers Ports and Terminals, and the Gulf Intracoastal Canal Association (GICA).

Editorials in the journal often address federal, state and local regulation as they relate to the rivers and waterways and those who used them for transport.

The Herman T. Pott National Inland Waterways Library, housed at the University of Missouri at St. Louis, is developing a keyword-searchable archive of past Waterways Journal issues.

== Other publications ==
The Waterways Journal publishes several authoritative reference works for the river industry. These include the Inland River Record, a complete listing of inland commercial vessels updated annually, and the Inland River Guide, an annual directory of companies with waterways-related business, including barge and towing companies; harbor fleeting companies; terminals; shipyard and repair facilities; refuelers and boat store companies; contractors and dredging companies; marine brokers, surveyors and insurers; diving and salvage companies; and distributors and manufacturers that have an inland waterways customer base.

It also annually publishes Quimby's Cruising Guide, an authoritative guide for pleasure boaters to 9,436 miles of waterway on 22 rivers and the Gulf Intracoastal Waterway. Arranged by river, then river mile, it includes information on locks, towns, restaurants, bed and breakfasts, landmarks, and local history.

Since 2009, The Waterways Journal Inc. has published the International Dredging Review. Edited by founder Judith Powers, the IDR covers the international dredging industry, related industries, and their customers, including but not limited to public and private ports and government agencies, environmental and land reclamation interests, hydrographic surveyors, and vendors to the dredging industry.

In June 2012, The Waterways Journal acquired and publishes Marina Dock Age, a magazine dedicated to dockyard and boatyard management and edited by Anna Townshend that publishes 8 issues a year.

In 2013, The Waterways Journal expanded from publishing into event management by creating, producing and organizing the first annual Inland Marine Expo (IMX), which has become an important annual event and showcase for the inland river community and those who supply and serve it.

Between January 2015 and 2019, The Waterways Journal had a publishing relationship with Terrain magazine, founded by Brad Kovach, which covers "outdoor fitness, adventure and discovery" in St. Louis and the Midwest.
