= Maintenance management professional =

The Maintenance Management Professional designation (MMP) is a registered professional designation in Canada issued on the authority of the President of PEMAC Asset Management Association of Canada (PEMAC) to individuals who successfully complete a series of eight courses and who are members in good standing of PEMAC. The series of courses is designed to provide participants with an understanding of the various concepts necessary to be an effective maintenance and physical asset management professional. The courses are offered through several teaching institutions in Canada.

== Required courses ==
The program is broken down into a series of 8 courses, or modules, as follows:

Course	Course Title	Course Length
Module 1	Maintenance Management Skills and Techniques	(15 hours)
Module 2	Production and Operations Management for the Maintenance Manager	(30 hours)
Module 3	Human Resource Management for the Maintenance Manager	(30 hours)
Module 4	Financial Management for the Maintenance Manager	(30 hours)
Module 5	Developing and Implementing Maintenance Tactics	(30 hours)
Module 6	Maintenance Planning and Scheduling	(30 hours)
Module 7	Computerized Maintenance Management Systems	(30 hours)
Module 8	Capstone Project	(30 hours)

== Institutions ==
The participating teaching institutions are:

- Bow Valley College
- British Columbia Institute of Technology
- Cambrian College
- College of New Caledonia
- College of the North Atlantic
- Conestoga College
- Fanshawe College
- Humber College
- Keyano College
- Mohawk College
- Northern College
- Northern Lakes College
- St. Clair College
- Université du Québec

== See also ==
- Enterprise asset management
