= Lester Afflick =

American poet

Lester Afflick (1956 – January 2000) was a downtown New York City writer and poet.

== Biography ==
Born in Kingston, Jamaica, in 1956, Afflick came to the United States with his family when he was 16 years old, and attended Brooklyn College. In New York, Afflick co-edited The Door Newsletter and contributed widely to the downtown poetry and literature scene. Afflick was featured in the 1979 Waterways: Poetry in the Mainstream festival and publications. He was also published in Box 749, a Magazine of Printable Arts. In 2008, a collection of his poetry was published by Fly By Night Press under the title I Dream About You Baby.
