= SS Ideal X =

First container ship

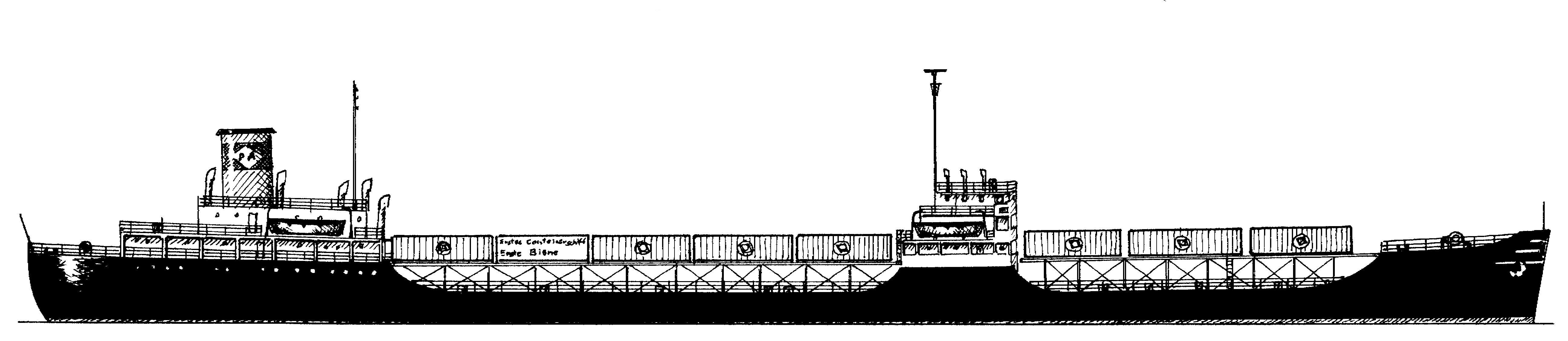
- Plan of the SS Ideal X

History
- Name: Ideal X, ex-Potrero Hills, ex-Capt. John D.P., ex-Elemir
- Owner: Pan-Atlantic Steamship Company
- Port of registry: United States
- Builder: Rebuilt as container ship at Bethlehem Steel, Baltimore, MD.
- Launched: 30 December 1944
- Completed: January 1945
- Out of service: Sold for scrapping, 1965.
- Identification: Official number: 247155
- Fate: Scrapped in Japan, 1967.
- Notes: Former T2 tanker. Originally built by Marinship Corp. in Sausalito, California as yard number 158 in 1945.

General characteristics
- Class & type: T2-SE-A1
- Tonnage: 16,460 GRT
- Length: 524 ft (160 m)
- Beam: 30 ft (9.1 m)
- Height: 68 ft (21 m)
- Propulsion: Elliot Company steam turbine, electric propulsion.
- Capacity: 58 33-foot containers; 10,572 DWT
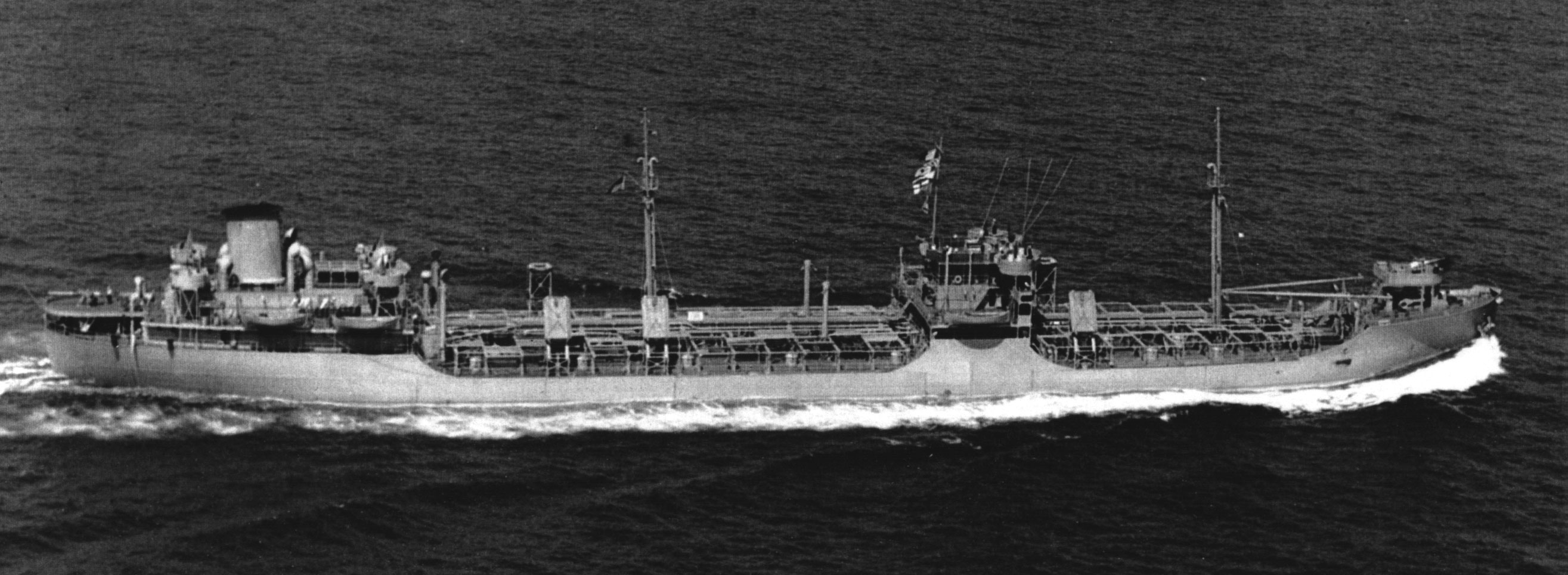
- The Ideal X was originally constructed as a T2 tanker, similar to the Hat Creek shown here in August 1943.

SS Ideal X, a converted World War II T-2 oil tanker, was the first commercially successful container ship.

Built by The Marinship Corporation during World War II as Potrero Hills, she was later purchased by Malcom McLean's Pan-Atlantic Steamship Company. In 1955, the ship was modified to carry shipping containers and rechristened Ideal X. During her first voyage in her new configuration, on 26 April 1956, the Ideal X carried 58 containers from Port Newark, New Jersey, to Port of Houston, Texas, where 58 trucks were waiting to be loaded with the containers. It was not the first purpose-built container ship: the Clifford J. Rodgers, operated by the White Pass and Yukon Route, had made its debut in 1955.

In 1959, the vessel was acquired by Bulgarian owners, who rechristened her Elemir. The Elemir suffered extensive damage during heavy weather on 8 February 1964, and was sold in turn to Japanese breakers. She was finally scrapped on 20 October 1964, in Hirao, Japan.
