= Container on barge =

Form of intermodal freight transport

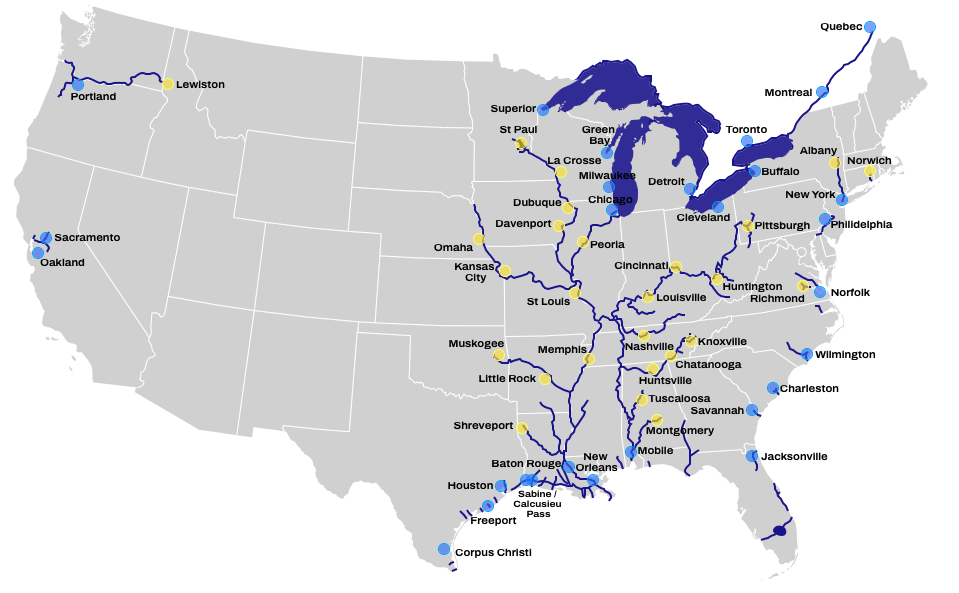
Inland waterway system

Container on barge is a form of intermodal freight transport where containers are stacked on a barge and towed to a destination .

== In the United States ==
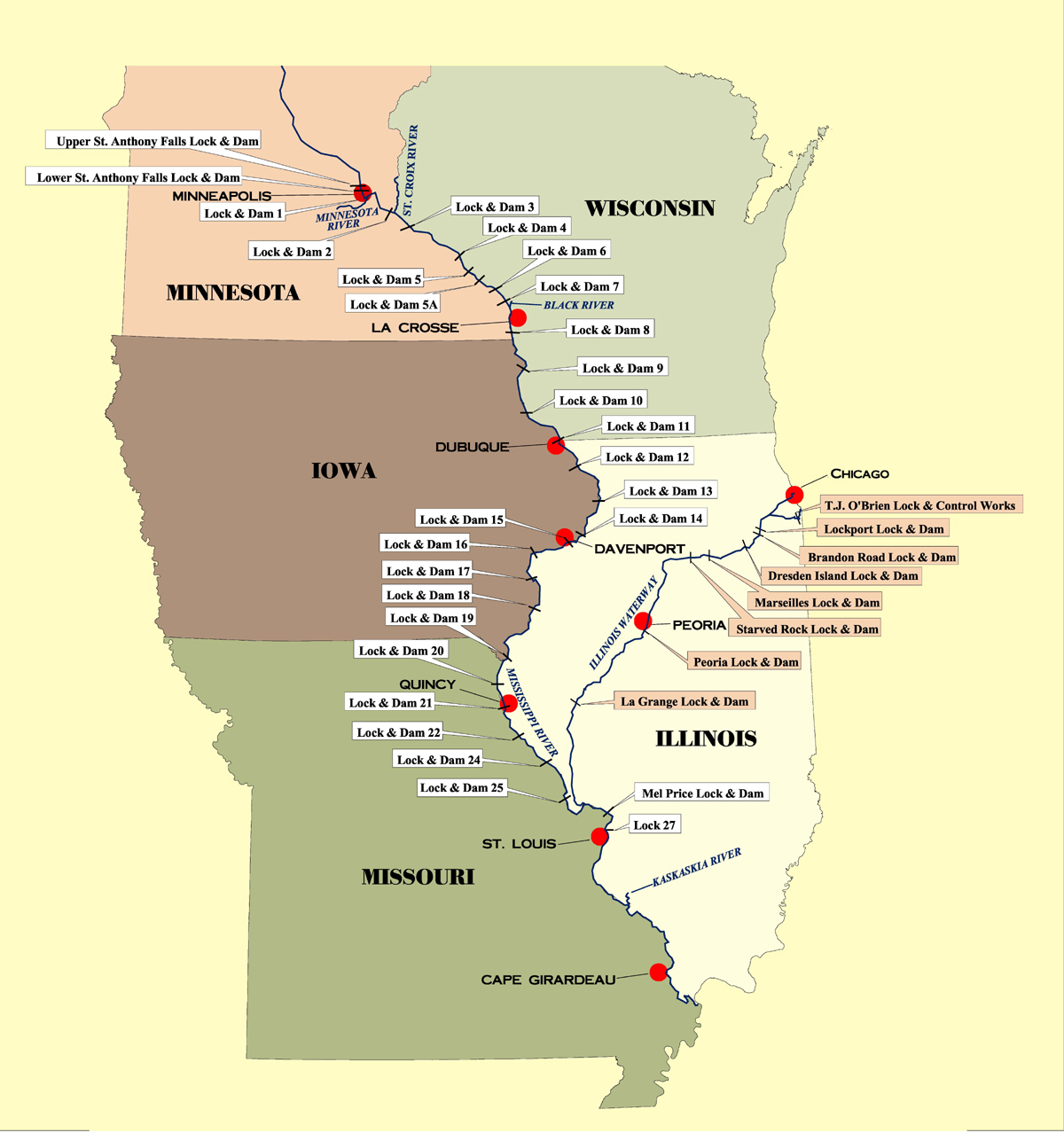
Upper Mississippi Lock and dams are 600' x 110'

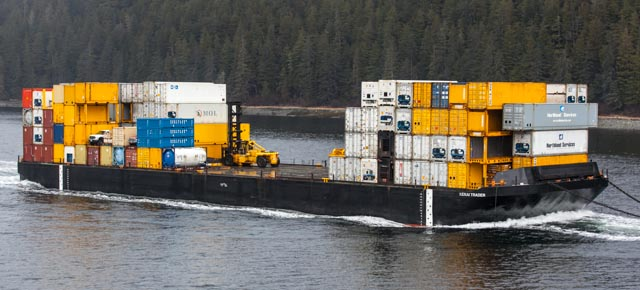
A barge headed to Alaska carrying containerized cargo

There is limited use of this mode of transport because a lack of infrastructure on the upriver side in the United States. Historically, container on barge service could not compete with rail service because of the at times significantly longer transit time limiting its ability to transport time sensitive cargoes.

With the development of the Louisiana International Terminal at the mouth of the Mississippi River, container on barge traffic could become mainstream, especially on the nation's inland waterways.

=== Missouri River ===
The Missouri River has no locks and dams on it from Omaha, Nebraska to St. Louis, and there is only one lock and dam above St. Louis, south of the confluence of the Mississippi and Missouri Rivers, to lock through, the Chain of Rocks Lock, to get to the lower Mississippi.

=== Ohio River ===
The Ohio River has 21 locks all the way up to Pittsburgh and locking through takes about 30–45 minutes with a full 3x5, 15 unit barge.

=== Upper Mississippi ===
The Upper Mississippi has 25+ locks and dams from St. Louis to Minneapolis that are 600-foot locks and only allow 6 to 8 barge units per tow without having to double lock through gates (double locking takes 2 hours+).

=== Lower Mississippi ===
The Lower Mississippi from St. Louis to the Port of New Orleans has no locks or dams and allows barges up to 7x6 or 42 barge units per tow. Oceangoing ships with drafts of 45 feet and height clearances over 150 feet can navigate the waters up to Baton Rouge.

=== Plans for future developments ===
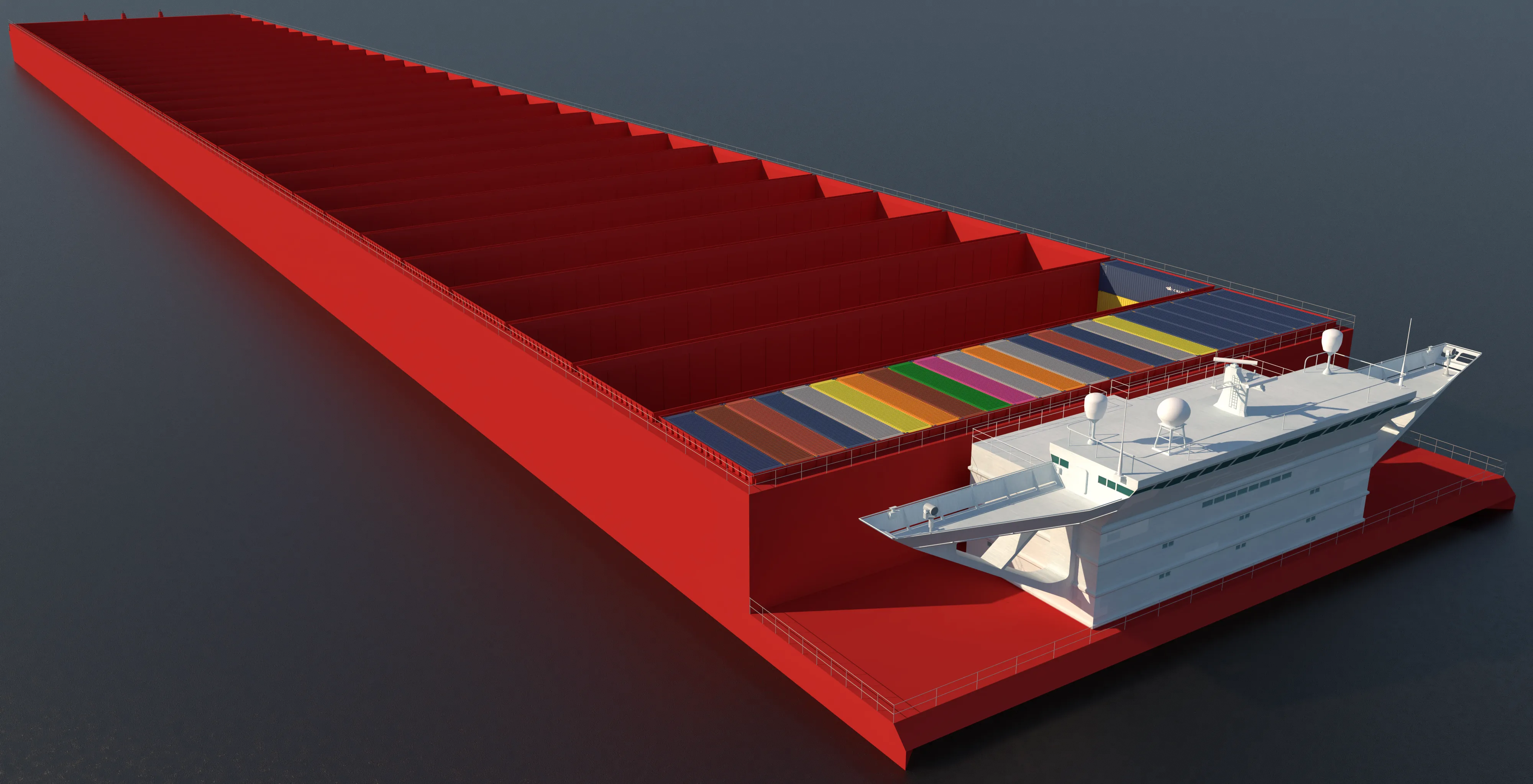
3D sketch of a container feeder barge for the Lower Mississippi that is 1,400x210 feet and could handle over 3,500 forty foot containers

The Mediterranean Shipping Company along with the State of Louisiana and other investors are going to invest $1.8 billion to build a container terminal at St. Bernard Parish, Louisiana, to open by 2028, it is going to be called the Louisiana International Terminal or 'LIT'.

== See also ==
- Container port design process
- Feeder ship
- Intracoastal Waterway
- Roll-on/roll-off car carrying ship
- United States container ports
