= Belarusian Americans in New York City =

Ethnic group

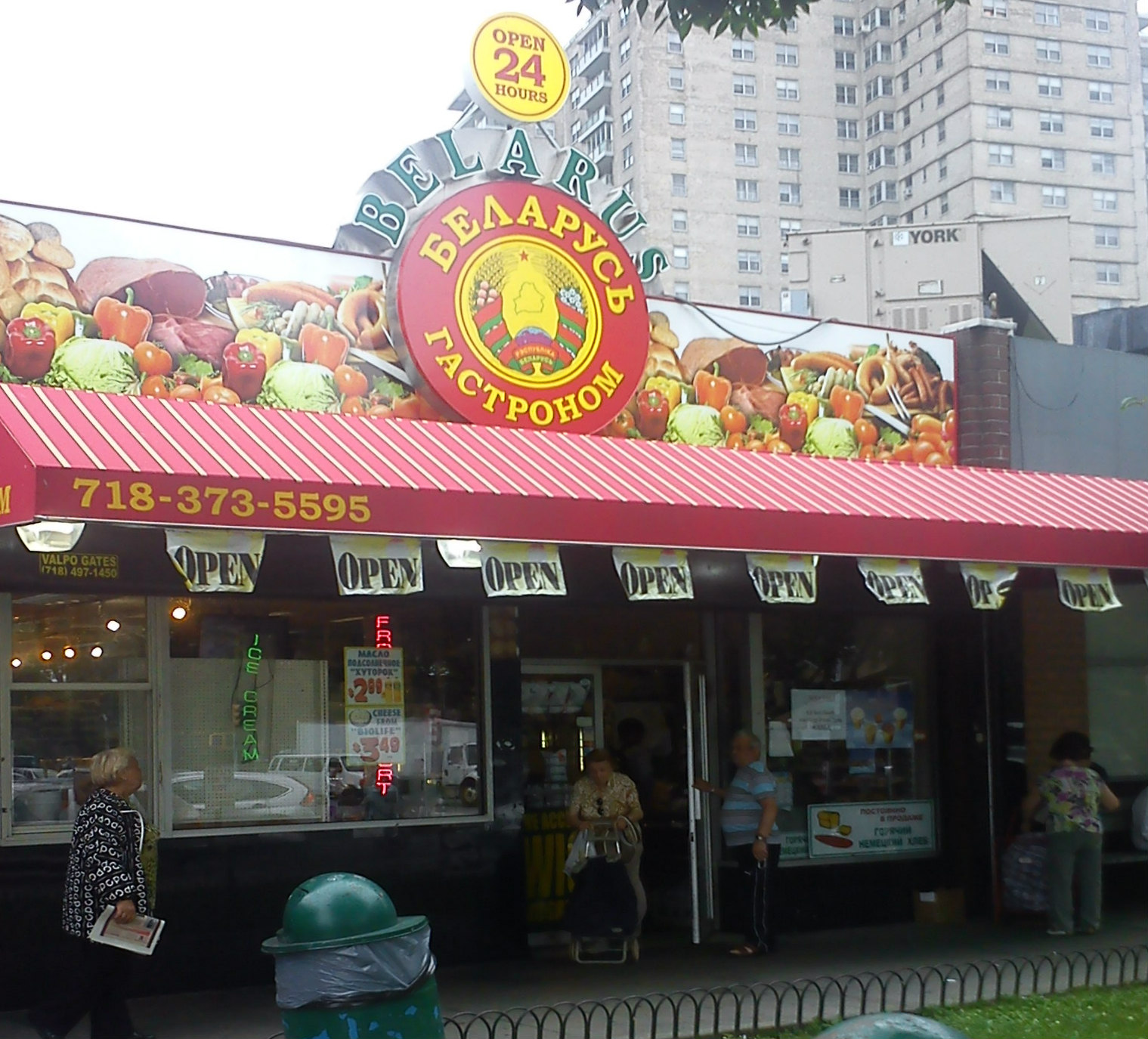
A Belarusian grocery store in New York City, July 2016.

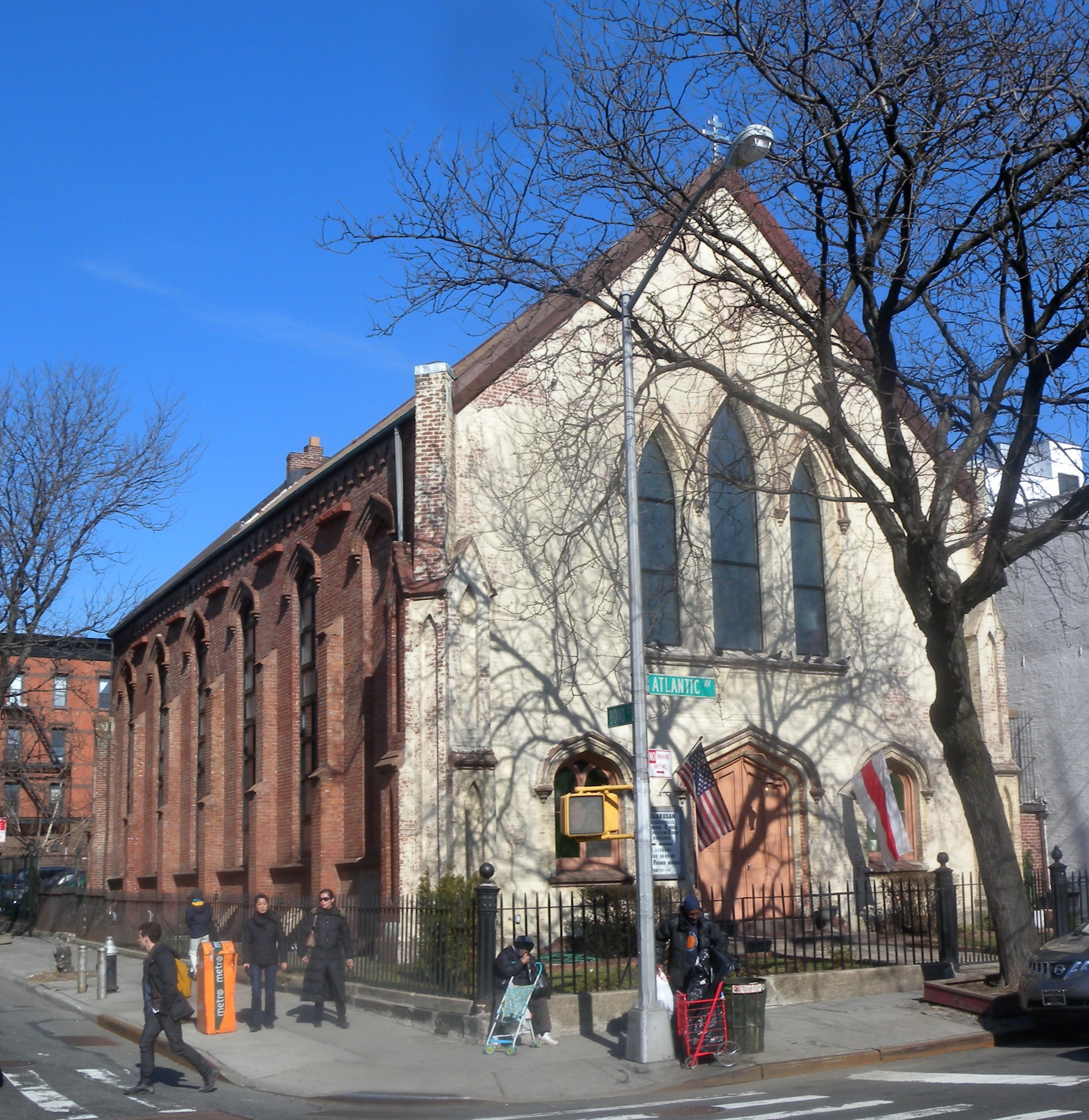
St. Cyril of Turov Cathedral, a church of the Belarusian Autocephalous Orthodox Church in Boerum Hill, 2011.

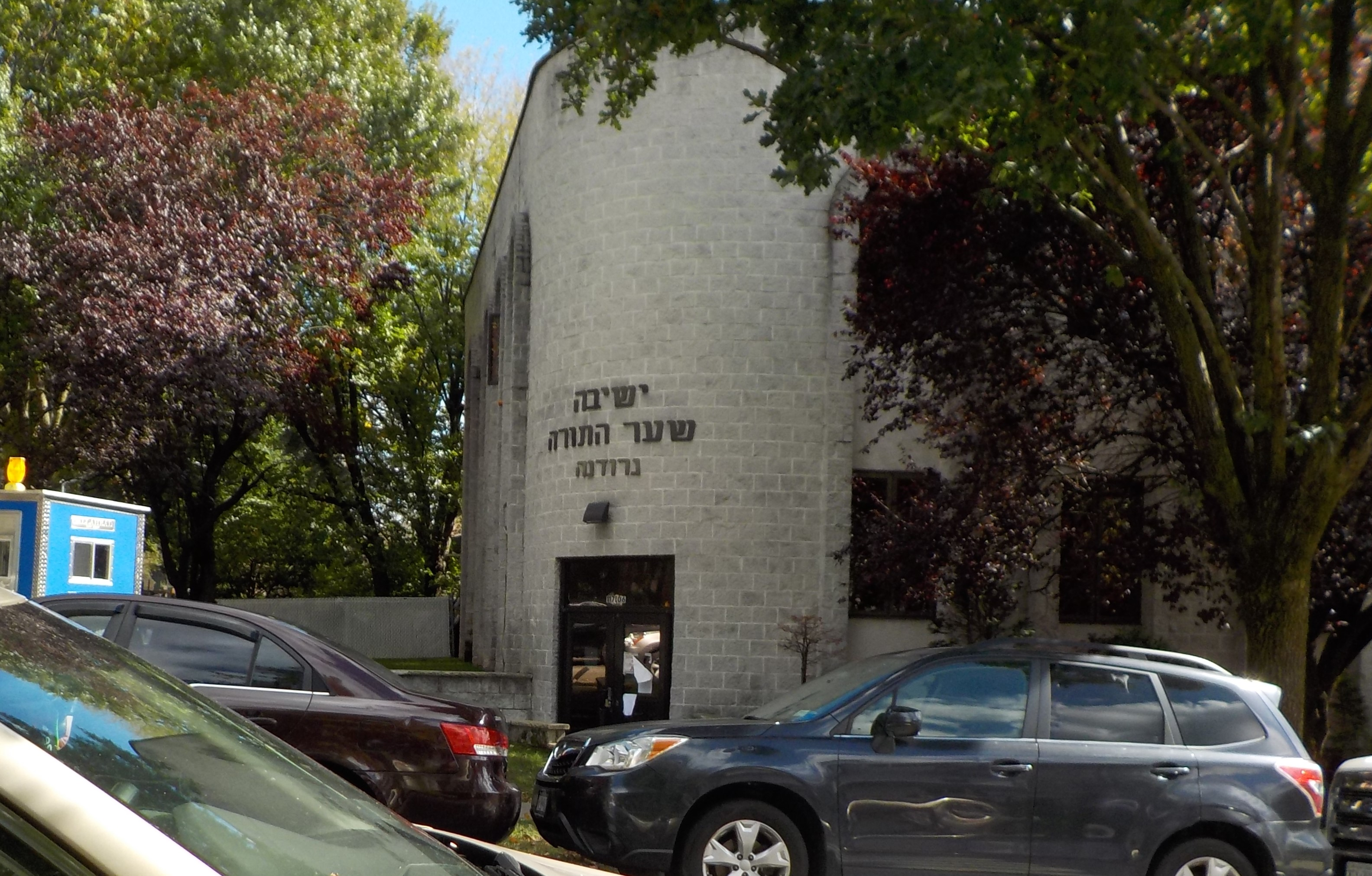
Yeshiva Shaar HaTorah in Kew Gardens, Queens, September 2020.

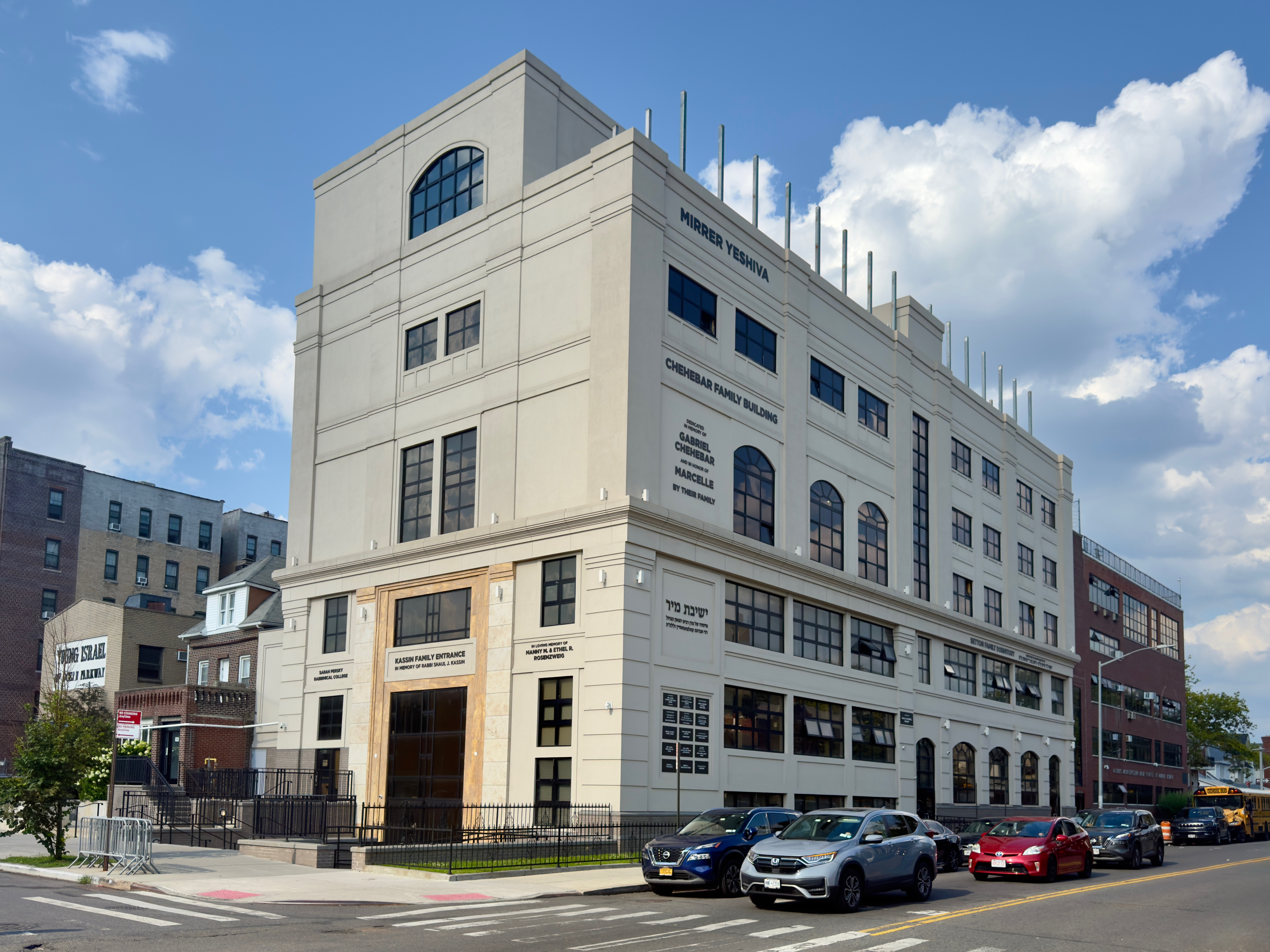
Mir Yeshiva of Brooklyn, 2025

New York City includes a sizeable Belarusian American population. The New York metropolitan area has one of the largest concentrations of Belarusians in the United States. Many Belarusians live in Brighton Beach and elsewhere in South Brooklyn, along with other ex-Soviet immigrants including Russians and Ukrainians. Around 55,000 people of Belarusian descent live in the New York City metropolitan area, with estimates ranging from 50,000 to 75,000.

== History ==
In the late 1800s and early 1900s, a large wave of immigrants from what is now Belarus came to the United States, with many settled in New York City. This wave of immigrants was predominantly Jewish, with a sizable minority being Christian and a small minority being Muslim. Commons reasons for Belarusian emigration included poor economic conditions, restrictions placed on the Belarusian language including the closure of Belarusian schools in Poland and the banning of Belarusian-language newspapers, lack of educational opportunities, high taxation, and antisemitic or anti-religious discrimination against Belarusian Orthodox Jews. Due to the shifting cultural and political geography of Eastern Europe, Jews from what is now Belarus may identify simply as Jewish, as Belarusian Jews, Litvaks (Lithuanian Jews), Russian Jews, Polish Jews, some combination of these identities, or some other form of ethnic/national identifying. Because Belarusian territory was once part of the Russian Empire and later a federal unit of the Soviet Union, Belarusian emigrants (both Jewish and non-Jewish) may or may not be registered as Belarusians on US Census documents.

In the 1970s, Brighton Beach in Brooklyn became a leading destination for ex-Soviet emigrants to the United States. Many Belarusians settled here, along with Russians, Ukrainians, peoples of the Caucasus such as Georgians, and Central Asians (particularly Uzbeks). The neighborhood is predominantly middle-class, Jewish, and Russian-speaking.

During the 2020–2021 Belarusian protests, multiple protests were held in New York City in solidarity with the Belarusian democracy movement and with Belarusian women.

== Demographics ==
Of the approximately 55,000 people of Belarusian descent living in the New York metropolitan area, 11,000 are non-Jewish and 44,000 are Belarusian Jews. Non-Jewish Belarusians tend to identify more closely with Belarusian culture, as many Belarusian Jews identify more with Jewish and/or Russian culture. Most Belarusian Jews are irreligious, while a minority are religious. Most non-Jewish Belarusians are Christian and are largely affiliated with the Russian Orthodox Church (around 90% have some affiliation), with a minority of 10% being Roman Catholics. Less than 2% are Evangelical Christians, so there are no Evangelical churches catering to Belarusians. The majority languages of Belarusians are Belarusian and Russian. Accurately estimating the population of people of Belarusian descent can be difficult, as some people whose ancestors come from Belarus may identify as Polish or Russian instead. A small minority of Belarusians are Lipka Tatars, a Turkic ethnic group from Belarus, Poland, and Lithuania who practice Sunni Islam.

Compared to some other Slavic and Eastern European groups such as Ukrainians, the Belarusian community in New York City and the United States is more scattered and less cohesive. Community engagement of young people is a concern with Belarusian community advocates. Belarusian church-goers tend to be older and Belarusian youths are less engaged in community institutions. Belarusians who are active in Belarusian circles arrange meetings at a building in downtown Brooklyn, as well as in various bars. However, plans exist to create a Belarusian community center, cafe, and boutique, but the high cost of rent has delayed implementation of the plan.

== Cuisine ==
Belarusian cuisine can be found at restaurants and groceries in New York City, including the Belarussian Xata restaurant in Sheepshead Bay and the Belarus Supermarket in West Brighton. Due to being landlocked, seafood is not a common staple of the Belarusian diet. Staples of Belarusian cuisine include beef, pork, mushrooms, grains, and potatoes. Belarusian cuisine varies according to religion; pork is a common dish for Belarusian Christians, but does not feature in the cuisine of Belarusian Jews who keep kosher or Belarusian Muslims who keep halal. Many Lipka Tatar Muslims drink alcohol, while still refraining from pork. Bagels, dranikai (latkes), babka, cabbage rolls, borscht, and kholodets (meat jelly) remain staples in many Belarusian-American homes.

== Culture ==
A small Belarusian-Jewish klezmer music scene exists in Brooklyn, incorporating elements of traditional Belarusian and Litvak music.

Each year a Belarusian festival is held at St. Cyrcil's church. The festival is part of the annual Atlantic Antic street festival.

LGBT Belarusians are involved in RUSA LGBT, a community organization for Russian-speaking LGBT immigrants from Belarus, Russia, Ukraine, Kazakhstan, Kyrgyzstan, and other ex-Soviet states. The co-president of RUSA LGBT, Nina Long, is Belarusian. The organization was founded in 2008 and participates in the annual NYC Pride March. In 2013, after a crackdown by Belarusian police, a small delegation of LGBT Belarusians and their supporters toured the United States, including a stop in New York City.

== Institutions ==
The Belarusan-American Association is headquartered in Brooklyn. It was formed in 2006 by a generation of political refugees who left Belarus after Alexander Lukashenko became president of Belarus in 1994.

In 1950, Belarusian immigrants founded Biełarus, a Belarusian-language newspaper. It is the largest and oldest Belarusian publication outside of Belarus. The newspaper is published every two months by the Belarusan-American Association. Politically, the newspaper holds an anti-Lukashenko line.

There is a Belarusian church, St. Cyril of Turov Cathedral, located at the intersection of Atlantic Avenue and Bond Street in the neighborhood of Boerum Hill. The church is affiliated with the Belarusian Autocephalous Orthodox Church. The church functions as the hub of the Belarusian Christian community in New York City. The Belarusian Autocephalous Orthodox Church (BAOC) is a small, independent church with roots in the Belarusian Orthodox Church that does not have official recognition from the Eastern Orthodox Church, serving the interests of the Belarusian emigre community. The BAOC regards the Lukashenko government is an illegitimate regime. The church archbishop of the church has declared Alexander Lukashenko "anathema" for alleged abuses against "the pious Belarusian people". Archbishop Sviataslau (Lohin) of the BAOC has denounced Lukashenko as a "dictator, murderer, and torturer" and accused the Belarusian state of "genocide of Belarusians".

Lipka Tatars from Belarus, Poland, and Lithuania established a mosque in Brooklyn. Founded by the American Mohammedan Society, the Powers Street Mosque is the oldest surviving mosque in the United States. While membership in the mosque has declined, it is still an important Lipka Tatar community hub and is open for major holiday events including iftar dinners and Kurban Bayrami (Lithuanian for Eid al-Adha). Due to Soviet Union's Iron Curtain, the Lipka Tatar community of New York City was cut off from their compatriots in the Baltic and Central European countries for decades. However, since the fall of the Soviet Union some Lipka Tatars have been able to visit their homelands and reconnect with relatives. Many Lipka Tatar families affiliated with the Powers Street Mosque can trace their roots back to the Belarusian city of Iwye.

The Mount Hebron Cemetery in Flushing, Queens, contains a large monument to deceased Jewish immigrants and their descendants from the city of Grodno in western Belarus, maintained by the Grodner Aid Benevolent Association of Brooklyn. The monument reads, "In memoriam to our dear parents, brothers and sisters of the city of Grodno and environs who were brutally persecuted and slain by the Nazis during World War II."

The Karlin-Stolin Hasidic dynasty, which has communities in New York City, has its roots in the Belarusian cities of Karlin and Stolin.

Between the 1880s and 1920s, many Jews from what is now Belarus settled in New York City, founding numerous synagogues. Synagogues founded by Jewish emigrants from Belarus include: Anshei Selib (Vselyub), Adath Jeshurun/Jeshuran Anshe(i) Kamenetz/Kamenitz (Kamenets), Chevrah Anshei Narowla (Narovlya), Beth Haknesseth Anshei Lubavitz v'Homler Lubavichi (Gomel), Gemilath Chasodim Anshei Motele (Motel), Anshei Mozir (Mozyr), Chevrah Oheb Sholom Anshei Gluboka (Glebokie), Beth Haknesseth Anshei Minsk (Minsk), Anshe Osmine Vanshe Trab (Oshmyany), Ahavath Achim Anshe Usda Ahavath Torah (Uzda), Chevrah Anshei Mir (Mir), Chevrah Rabenu Nachum Anshei Grodno (Grodno), Congregation Kahal Adath Yeshurun with Anshe Lubitz (Lyubcha), Chevrah Achei Grodno v'Anshei Staputkin (Grodno), Chevrah Dorshay Tov Anshei Pinsk (Pinsk), American Minsker Gemilath Chesed (Minsk), Cochav Jacob Anshei Kamenitz d'Lita (Kamenets), and many others.

The Mir Yeshiva and the Beth Hatalmud Rabbinical College in Brooklyn were founded after the original Mir Yeshiva in Mir, Belarus. Other locations are in Jerusalem and the West Bank settlement of Modi'in Illit.

== Notable New Yorkers of Belarusian descent ==
- Bohdan Andrusyshyn, a Belarusian journalist and former singer.
- Mary Antin, an author and immigration rights activist best known for her 1912 autobiography The Promised Land.
- Ralph Elihu Becker, a diplomat and attorney who served as U.S. Ambassador to Honduras from 1976–1977 under the Ford administration.
- Sandor Katz, a food writer and DIY food activist best known for writing Wild Fermentation.
- Ihor R. Lemischka, an internationally recognized stem cell biologist and stem cell research advocate.
- Jonas Salk, a virologist and medical researcher who developed one of the first successful polio vaccines.
- Joseph Smagorinsky, a meteorologist and the first director of the National Oceanic and Atmospheric Administration (NOAA)'s Geophysical Fluid Dynamics Laboratory (GFDL).
- Gary Vaynerchuk, businessman, speaker, author, and Internet personality
- Baruch Charney Vladeck, a Minsk-born labor leader, manager of The Jewish Daily Forward, and member of the New York City Council.
- Miriam Wolfe, an actress, director, producer and writer, who worked in theatre, television and radio from the 1920s to the 1950s.
- Jan Zaprudnik, a historian, publicist, Belarusian community leader in the United States.

== See also ==
- Belarusians in Chicago
- Russian Americans in New York City
- Ukrainian Americans in New York City
