= American Hemp Farmer =

2020 non-fiction book by Doug Fine

American Hemp Farmer: Adventures and Misadventures in the Cannabis Trade
- First edition
- Author: Doug Fine
- Subject: Hemp farming
- Genre: Nonfiction
- Publisher: Chelsea Green Publishing
- Publication date: April 1, 2020
- Publication place: United States
- Pages: 320
- ISBN: 9781603589192
- OCLC: 1124591487

American Hemp Farmer: Adventures and Misadventures in the Cannabis Trade is a non-fiction book about hemp farming employing sustainable agriculture, written by American author and farmer Doug Fine and published by Chelsea Green Publishing in 2020.

The book covers agronomic and agricultural issues such as soil preparation, planting, growing, and harvesting; processing and hemp oil extraction; and economic considerations such as seed prices and formation of agricultural cooperatives for hemp agribusiness, as well as the regulatory concerns of the business.

As of 2020, the author conducted farming operations in Vermont. Acres USA and the author have created a regenerative agriculture course.

As of early 2022, the book had been developed into a television pilot and was seeking distribution.

== Critical reception ==
Publishers Weekly said about the book, "For anyone interested in hemp cultivation or simply learning more about the newest 'gold rush' crop, this is well worth picking up."

Library Journal said the book aimed to "convince farmers and legislators not to repeat the mistakes of the past by allowing farmers to control more of the process from seed breeding, distribution, and processing", and the author's first-person style had "often comic results", finding the book "compelling and sometimes inspiring and the advice is practical".

A reviewer writing for The Idaho Press said "[this book is] for farmers only. It's not for weekend dabblers or big corporations" and "Fine is honest but not discouraging in his tales of 'misadventures', told with the kind of humor farmers share at the local café...he's done the hard work of making mistakes, so you don't have to".

== See also ==
- List of books about cannabis
