= Doug Fine =

American author, journalist, humorist and goat herder

- Born: New York, United States
- Education: Stanford University
- Occupations: Author, journalist, filmmaker, speaker, comedian
- Website: www.dougfine.com

Doug Fine is an American author, filmmaker, journalist, humorist, and goat herder.

== Early life ==
Fine began his career as a freelance journalist for such organizations as The Washington Post, Salon, U.S. News & World Report, Sierra, Wired, Outside, National Public Radio, and many other venues. His investigative reporting took him to five continents, often to remote locations like Burma, Rwanda, Laos, Guatemala and Tajikistan. One of his dispatches, on Burmese democracy efforts, was read into the Congressional Record. Fine won numerous awards for his radio reporting from rural Alaska before he moved to New Mexico.

== Not Really An Alaskan Mountain Man ==
In an experiment to see if someone raised in suburban consumer culture could manage a comfortable life in an extremely rural situation, Fine moved to a remote part of Alaska in the winter of 1998. The result was his first book, Not Really An Alaskan Mountain Man, published by Alaska Northwest Books, an imprint of Graphic Arts Center Publishing. As Fine works to hone what he calls his "Indigenous Gene," the book is a document of wilderness adventure as Fine learns how to live in a one-room cabin surrounded by moose and "non-liberals."

== Farewell, My Subaru ==
Fine's second book, Farewell, My Subaru, was published March 24, 2009 by Villard Books, an imprint of Random House. The book documents life at Fine's Funky Butte Ranch. It became a bestseller and is now in its seventh printing, with Chinese and Korean language editions. Fine's challenges in the book come from dealing with his mischievous goats, setting up his Funky Butte Ranch's solar power system, converting his used truck to run on vegetable oil, and growing his ranch's own crops.

Farewell, My Subaru's critical acclaim in national and international media includes comparisons to Bill Bryson and Douglas Adams, landing Fine television interviews on CNN and on The Tonight Show with Jay Leno.

== Too High to Fail ==
Fine's third book, Too High to Fail: Cannabis and the New Green Economic Revolution, was published by Gotham Books, an imprint of Penguin Group, on August 2, 2012. Pre-publication reviews included a starred Kirkus Reviews review reading in part, "Fine examines how the American people have borne the massive economic and social expenditures of the failed Drug War, which is "as unconscionably wrong for America as segregation and DDT." A captivating, solidly documented work rendered with wit and humor." Fine began promoting the book with an appearance on the Conan O'Brien show on July 25, 2012. Three weeks after publication, Too High to Fail debuted at #2 on the Denver Post bestseller list.

== Hemp Bound ==
Fine's fourth book, Hemp Bound: Dispatches From the Front Lines of the American Agricultural Revolution (Chelsea Green Books), was published in 2014. Willie Nelson's cover blurb calls the book "A blueprint for the America of the future."

== American Hemp Farmer Book and Film ==
Following the publication of a limited edition, part-hemp-printed monograph entitled, First Legal Harvest, Fine's fifth book, American Hemp Farmer (also Chelsea Green Books), was published in 2020. It was a finalist for the Santa Fe Reporter's Book of the Year.

On March 14, 2026, following five years of filming and post-production, interrupted at one point by his own wildfire evacuation, the feature documentary of American Hemp Farmer, produced and directed by Fine and based on his book of the same name, was release across the United States on PBS stations and streaming app.

== Personal life ==
Fine lives on the solar-powered Funky Butte Ranch, where, according to his website, he works for goats, plants and beneficial microbes.

== Works ==
- Not Really An Alaskan Mountain Man (2004)
- Farewell, My Subaru (2008)
- Too High to Fail (2012)
- Hemp Bound (2014)
- American Hemp Farmer (2020)
- https://www.pbs.org/show/american-hemp-farmer/ American Hemp Farmer Film (2026)
