= The Revolution Will Not Be Microwaved =

2006 book by Sandor Katz

The Revolution Will Not Be Microwaved: Inside America's Underground Food Movements
- Author: Sandor Katz
- Language: English
- Publisher: Chelsea Green Publishing
- Publication date: 2006
- Publication place: United States
- Media type: Paperback
- ISBN: 978-1-933392-11-0
- OCLC: 71005795
- LC Class: TX357.K38 2006

The Revolution Will Not Be Microwaved: Inside America's Underground Food Movements is a 2006 book by food activist Sandor Katz that examines how contemporary food production differs drastically from our recent past. The author challenges the corporate food industry as well as the way we think about food. He suggests how traditional cultural practices of sustainable agriculture might subvert the corporate farm system.

== See also ==
- Community-supported agriculture
- Family farms
- Farm-to-table cycle
- Fermented foods
- Food preservation
- Heirloom plants
- Local foods
- Organic farming
- Raw milk
- Seed saving
- Slow Food
- Urban agriculture
- Wild farming
