= Hemp Bound =

2014 book about hemp by Doug Fine

Hemp Bound: Dispatches from the Front Lines of the Next Agricultural Revolution
- Author: Doug Fine
- Subject: Hemp agriculture; United States drug policy
- Genre: Non-fiction
- Publisher: Chelsea Green
- Publication date: April 20, 2014
- ISBN: 978-1-60358-543-9
- OCLC: 1319726352
- Website: chelseagreen.co.uk/book/hemp-bound/

Hemp Bound: Dispatches from the Front Lines of the Next Agricultural Revolution is a 2014 book about hemp by Doug Fine. Kirkus Reviews said it was "A short, sweet, logical and funny argument for the potential of one of the world’s most dynamic cash crops." Boulder Weekly called it "a great addition to the literature surrounding a once-mainstay U.S. agricultural product". Reason said the book "is far from polemical or proselytizing. . . a narrative journey that includes visits with farmers, scientists, engineers, entrepreneurs, and politicians".

== See also ==
- List of books about cannabis
