= Dzmitry Hulecki =

Dzmitry Huletski (Гулецкий (rus.), Huletzky (germ.)) (born 29 March 1981) – independent Belarusian numismatic and antiquities researcher and publisher.

- 2005–2018 – Delegate of Belarus at numismatic conferences in Raubichi, Minsk (Belarus), Białystok (Poland), Moscow (Russia) and Vilnius (Lithuania)
- 2006–2018 – Numismatic publications in Bank informer magazine (Minsk, Belarus), Svensk Numismatisk Tidskrift magazine (Stockholm, Sweden), Bialoruskie Zeszyty Historyczne magazine (Białystok, Poland), Numizmatika (Vilnius, Lithuania) and other.
- 2008–2011 – Thematic articles in newspapers Bielarus (New York City, United States), "Soviet Belarus" (Minsk, Belarus)

Founder and the chief editor of the research series "Rus', Lithuania, Horde in artifacts of numismatics and sigillography" (Minsk-Moscow, since 2015). Awarded the gold mark of the Belarusian Numismatic Society (2017).

== Books ==
- 2007 – Book Coins of Belarus until 1707 (co-authorship, organization, foundation). Belarusian language. English summary
- 2007 – Book Historical coins in Belarus (authorship). Belarusian language
- 2008 – Book Collectable Heritage of the Grand Duchy of Lithuania (co-authorship, organization, foundation). Belarusian language.
- 2011 – Russian Wire Coins 1533–1645 guide book (authorship, organization, foundation). English language. English summary
- 2013 – "Russian Coins 1353–1533" (co-authored by K. Petrunin) (Rus.)
- 2014 – "Collectioner" (as co-author and editor) (Belarus.)
- 2015 – "Coins of Grand-Duchy of Lithuania from the second half of the 14th century to 1536" (Rus. & Eng.)
- 2015 – "100 most famous russian coins" (Rus.)
- 2015 – "100 most famous world coins" (Rus.)
- 2015 – "Early Russian Coins 1353–1533" (co-authored by K. Petrunin, A. Fishman) (Eng.)
- 2016 – "Coins of the Golden Horde: Period of the Great Mongols (1224–1266)» (with J. Farr)
- 2016 – "Early Russian Coins 930–1492 and their values" (vol. 1)
- 2017 – "Russian Medieval Coins" (with K. Petrunin)
- 2017 – "Early Lithuanian half-groats 1495–1529" (with G. Bagdonas and N. Doroshkevich)
- 2017 – "All the coins of Russia from ancient to modern times"
- 2018 – "Fur Money of Medieval Russia (11–13 cts)" (with N. Doroshkevich)
- 2019 – "Lithuanian Counterstamps 1421-1481 on the Golden Horde's Silvers" (with S. Liszewski)
- 2020 – "100 coins of the Grand Duchy of Lithuania" (with N. Doroshkevich)
- 2021 – "Lithuanian Coins 1495-1536" (with Giedrius Bagdonas)
- 2021 – "Regional coinage in Rus under the rule of the Grand Duchy of Lithuania" (with Konstantin Petrunin, Andrey V. Yakovlev)
- 2022 – "Russian Medieval Coins", 4th edition (with K. Petrunin)
- 2022 – "Lithuanian Grand Ducal Coins Before 1401"
- 2024 – "Coinage of the Grand Duchy of Ryazan" (with K. Petrunin)
- 2025 – "Lithuanian Coins 1495-1536", 2nd edition (with Giedrius Bagdonas)
