= Too High to Fail =

2012 book about cannabis by Doug Fine

Too High to Fail: Cannabis and the New Green Economic Revolution
- Author: Doug Fine
- Language: English
- Genre: Nonfiction
- Published: 2012
- Publisher: Gotham Books
- Pages: 319
- ISBN: 9781592407095
- OCLC: 757471294

Too High to Fail is a book about cannabis by Doug Fine, published by Gotham Books in 2012, describing Northern California's legal cannabis industry.

== See also ==
- List of books about cannabis
