= Belarusians in Chicago =

Ethnic group

Belarusians in Buffalo Grove near Chicago protest the government in Belarus during the 2020–2021 Belarusian protests

Belarusians in Chicago are an ethnic group in the Chicago metropolitan area.

== History ==
The first Belarusians to arrive in Chicago emigrated around 1900. During and after the Russian Revolution, many White émigrés came to the United States, including those from Belarus. By 1930, there were around 25,000 Belarusians living in Chicago In the late 1940s through the 1950s between 5,000 and 10,000 Belarusians immigrated to the Chicago area. Recent immigrants are concentrated around Wheeling, Illinois, near Chicago.

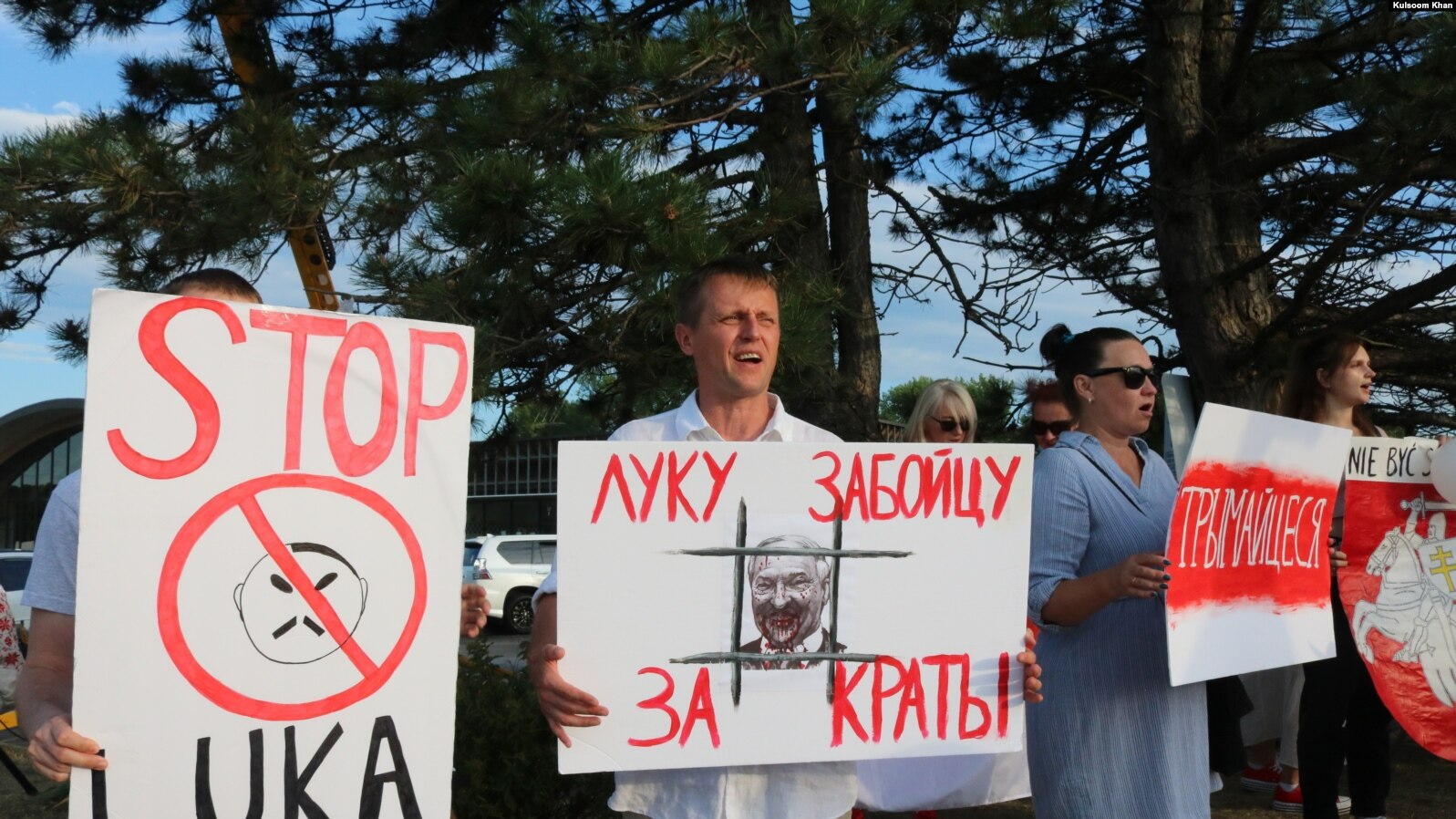
Belarusian Chicagoans protest in 2020.

During the 2020–2021 Belarusian protests, the Chicago community protested publicly, and Belarusian Chicagoans organized a photo exhibition about the protests.

== Cultural establishments ==
- 1920 - The White Russian National Committee
- 1923 - White Ruthenian National Association
- 1928-1932 - Belaruskaja Trybuna newspaper
- White Ruthenian Aid Committee
- White Russian-American Citizens Association
- 1941 - White Russian American National Council
- 1958 - Saint George Belarusian Orthodox Church of Chicago
- 1973 - Belarusian Coordinating Committee
- Belarus Free Theater
- Belarus in Chicago

== Notable people ==
- Harrison Ford
- Mikola Latushkin

== See also ==
- Belarusian Americans
- Belarusian Americans in New York City
