= Belarusian Americans =

Americans of Belarusian birth or descent

Беларускія амэрыканцы (Belarusian)

Total population
- 80,000; 600,000 (without descendants)

Regions with significant populations
- New York, New Jersey, Connecticut, Cleveland, Chicago, Los Angeles, Detroit, Minneapolis, Boston, Baltimore

Languages
- Belarusian, Russian, American English

Religion
- Predominantly Orthodoxy; Minority Roman Catholicism or Judaism

Related ethnic groups
- Russian Americans, Ukrainian Americans, Rusyn Americans, Polish Americans, Lithuanian Americans

Belarusian Americans, previously known as White Russian Americans, and sometimes as White Ruthenian Americans, are Americans who are of total or partial Belarusian ancestry.

== History ==
There is an assumption that the first Belarusian settlers in the United States, who settled there at the beginning of the 17th century in Virginia, could have been brought as Slavic slaves by Captain John Smith, who visited Belarus in 1603. The first wave of mass emigration from Belarus started in the final decades of the nineteenth century and continued until World War I. They emigrated to the United States via Libava (Liepāja, Latvia) and northern Germany. When they arrived, most settled in New York, Philadelphia, Boston, and Baltimore. However, most of these first Belarusians were registered either as Russians (those who were Orthodox Christians) or as Poles (Roman Catholics). This was because the first wave of immigrants came before the full development and spread of Belarusian nationalism. Most ethnic Belarusians (those who were not genetically or culturally Polish, Lithuanian, or Jewish) considered themselves to be Russian. Furthermore, even today, those who descend from pre-World War I immigrants often use the more archaic term "White Russian" to describe their ancestry instead of "Belarusian".

== Demography ==
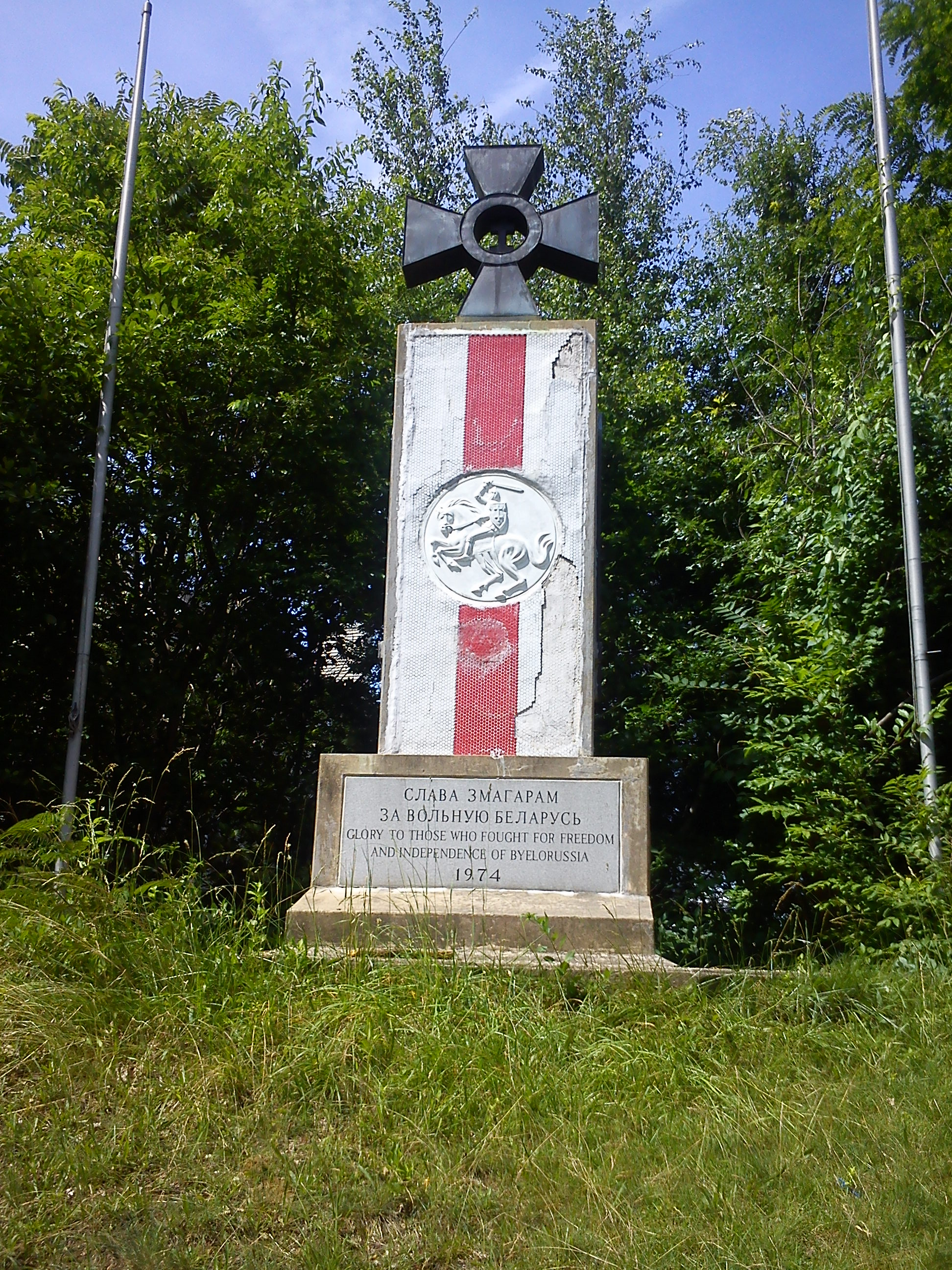
Monument in South River, New Jersey for "Those who fought for Freedom and Independence of Byelorussia"

According to the 1990 United States Census, only 4,277 respondents claimed Belarusian ancestry; there are no reports as to the estimated population from the 2000 census. The majority of the pre-Revolutionary immigrants from Belarus who were ethnic Belarusians identified as Russian, more or less holding Russophilic or Westrussianist views. A large portion of the Russian American community consisted of immigrants from Belarus. Belarus had, and still has, a Polish minority consisting of ethnic Poles, the descendants of the Polish nobility and gentry, as well as descendants of Polonized Belarusian peasants. In addition, the term "Belarusian" only became common near the end of the Soviet Union's existence, and most persons of Belarusian ancestry in the United States would be unaware of the term, referring to themselves as "White Russian" rather than "Belarusian".

Since it was customary in American English of that time to use a historical Ruthenian designation for various East Slavic peoples, Belarusians in the U.S. were sometimes referred to as White Ruthenians. For example, the first Belarusian-American newspaper, Belaruskaja trybuna (Belarusian: Беларуская трыбуна, lit. 'Belarusian Tribune'), was published since 1926 by the Whiteruthenian National Association, and had an English subtitle: Whiteruthenian Tribune.

The largest concentrations of Belarusian Americans are in the metropolitan New York area, New Jersey (especially Highland Park and South River), Cleveland (and its suburbs), Chicago (recent immigrants concentrated around Wheeling), Los Angeles, Sacramento (largely around Orangevale and North Highlands) and Detroit.

There were several waves of Belarusian influx into the U.S., one before the Russian Revolution, then in 1919-1939 from Western Belarus, then in the late 1940s-early 1950s (after the Second World War), and after the collapse of the USSR in the 1990s.

One major group of Belarusian immigrants to the U.S. are Belarusian Jews who migrated starting in the mid-19th century, having faced discrimination in the Russian Empire, which Belarus was part of at the time.

According to the 2000 Census Bureau report, 38,505 people who were born in Belarus lived in the United States. 1,363 of them spoke the Belarusian language at home.

=== Belarusian-born population ===
Belarusian-born population in the U.S. since 2010:

Year	Number
2010	56,217
2011	▲56,618
2012	▼49,823
2013	▲50,934
2014	▲56,791
2015	▲56,958
2016	▲62,514

== Education and culture ==
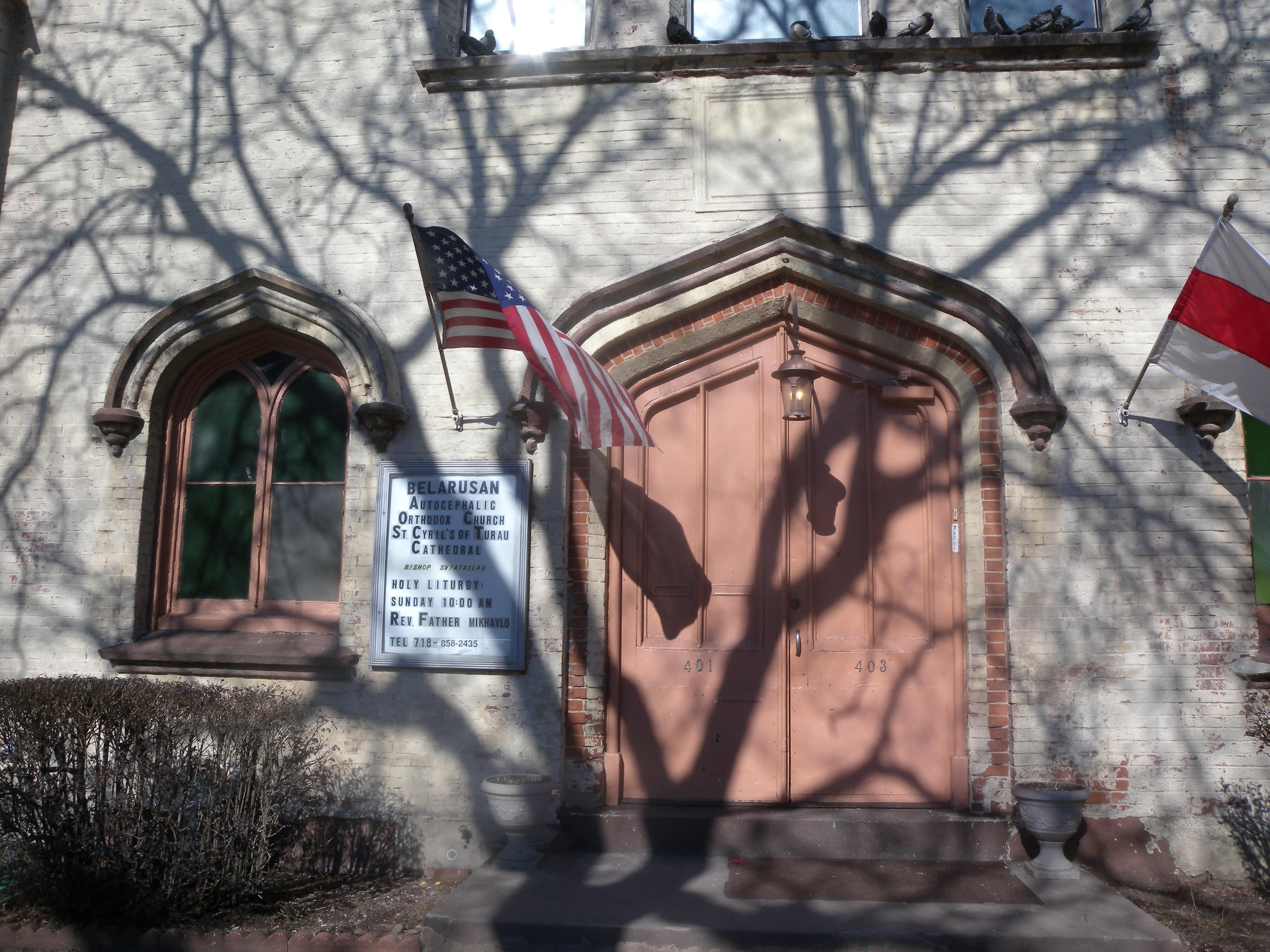
St. Cyril of Turov Cathedral (Belarusian Autocephalous Orthodox Church), Brooklyn.

There are several organizations in the United States that have developed a system of secondary schools in places with communities of Belarusian descent. These organizations have the goal of teaching the language, culture, and religious traditions of Belarus. Thus the Belarusian culture is represented by choirs, theatrical groups, and musical and dance ensembles. One of the more prominent associations is the Belarusan American Association. Red, white, black and green colors dominate in the national costume. The national costumes differ depending on the region of Belarus. In the 1950s the St. Euphrosynia Belarusian Orthodox Church was created in South River, New Jersey.

== Cuisine ==
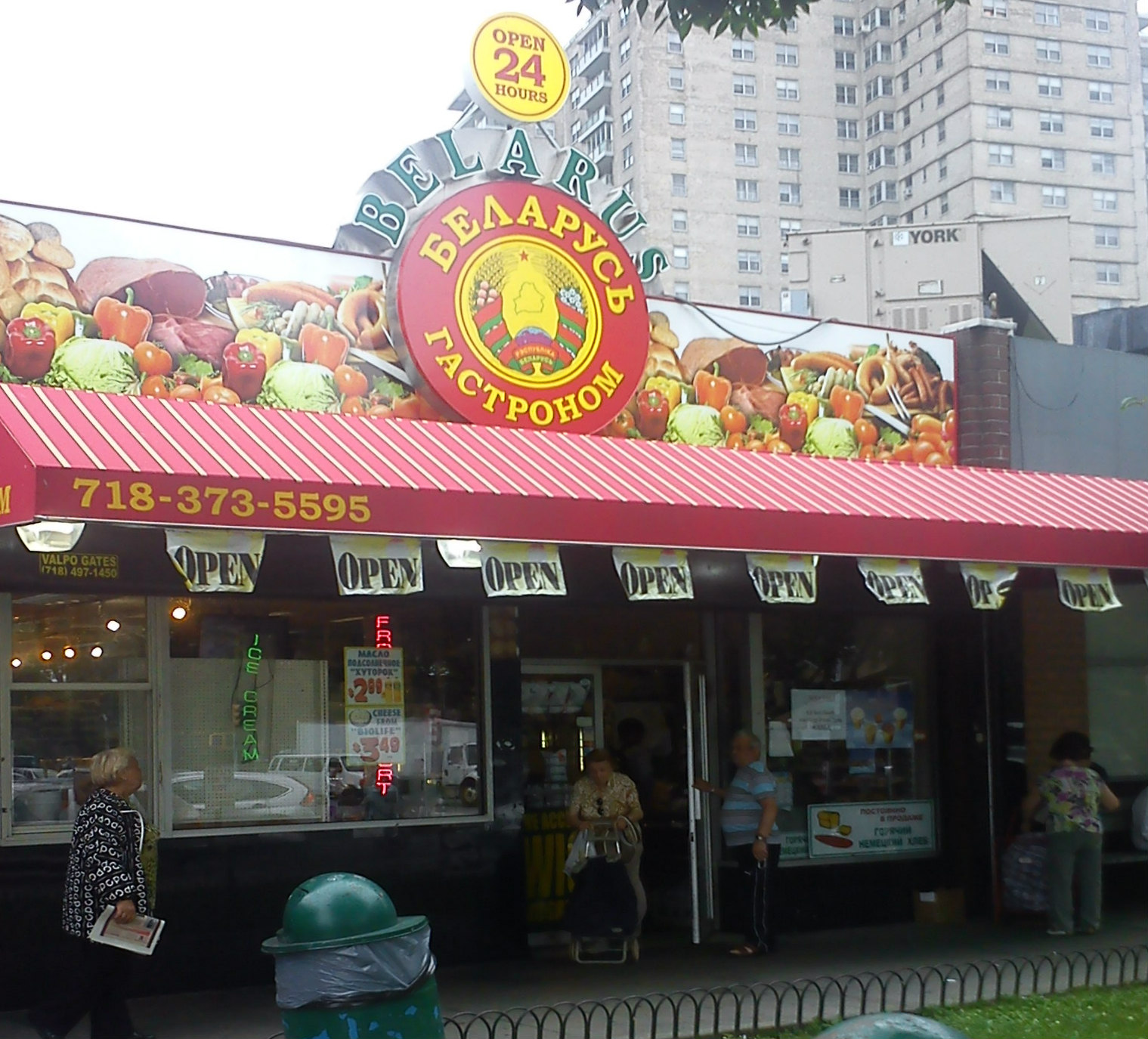
Belarus Gastronom on Neptune Avenue, Coney Island, in 2016 (since closed).

Belarusian cuisine has left a trace in the life of the Americans. One of the proofs is the traditional bagel. The Americans also know Belarusian pierogi, kielbasy and cabbages. The Belarusian cuisine is dominated by various grains, potatoes, beef, pork and mushrooms. Actually, many dishes are cooked from potatoes; for example, draniki, babka, etc. There are also dishes similar to the ones of neighboring countries (Lithuania, Latvia, Ukraine, Russia, Poland): cabbage rolls, bortsch, cold beetroot soup or meat jelly.

== Notable people ==
- Mary Antin
- Bailey Bass
- Irving Berlin
- Lisa Bonet
- Larry Brown
- Dick Dale
- Kirk Douglas
- Harrison Ford
- Al Franken
- Alex Galchenyuk
- Sam Gejdenson
- Wayne Gretzky
- Scarlett Johansson
- Ari Kagan
- Larry King
- Barys Kit
- Olga Korbut
- Zoë Kravitz
- Lisa Kudrow
- Jared Kushner
- Ralph Lauren
- Louis B. Mayer
- George de Mohrenschildt
- Siarhei Navumchyk
- Dasha Nekrasova
- Gwyneth Paltrow
- Zianon Pazniak
- Ryan Potter
- Greg Puciato
- Dmitry Sholokhov
- Nikolai Sudzilovsky
- Jazep Varonka
- Gary Vaynerchuk
- Jurka Vićbič
- Marianne Williamson
- Jan Zaprudnik
- Zebbler
- David Sarnoff
- Eugene Lyons

== See also ==
- Belarusian Americans in New York City
- Belarus–United States relations
- Belarusians in Chicago
- Russian Americans
- Ukrainian Americans

== Sources ==
- Kipel, Vitaut (1999). Belarusans in the United States. Lanham: University Press of America. ISBN 9780761813064.
