= Gaia Girls =

Children's books series

- Enter the Earth (2006); Way of Water (2007)
- Author: Lee Welles
- Language: English
- Genre: Children's
- Publisher: Chelsea Green Publishing
- No. of books: 2

Gaia Girls is the title of the children's book series by Lee Welles, published by Chelsea Green Publishing in Vermont. It focuses on the dying earth, personified as Gaia, and girls with the powers to control the elements.

The series consists of two published books: Enter the Earth (2006) and Way of Water (2007). Film rights for the series were optioned by Cause Pictures in 2015.

In 2006 Welles received the National Outdoor Book Award for Children's Literature for the Enter the Earth.

== Books ==
- Enter the Earth (2006) is about Elizabeth Angier, a girl who has just finished the fourth grade, who finds out that Harmony Farms, a factory farming company, is trying to buy her family's farm in upstate New York. She must drive them away with her new powers from Gaia, the Earth's entity represented as a talking otter.
- Way of Water (2007) is about Miho, a young girl whose parents died "lost at sea." She must move to Japan to live with an uncle she has never met before. She must use her powers given to her by Gaia to save her new dolphin friends and convince her uncle to stay and live by the sea in Goji.
