= Ihor R. Lemischka =

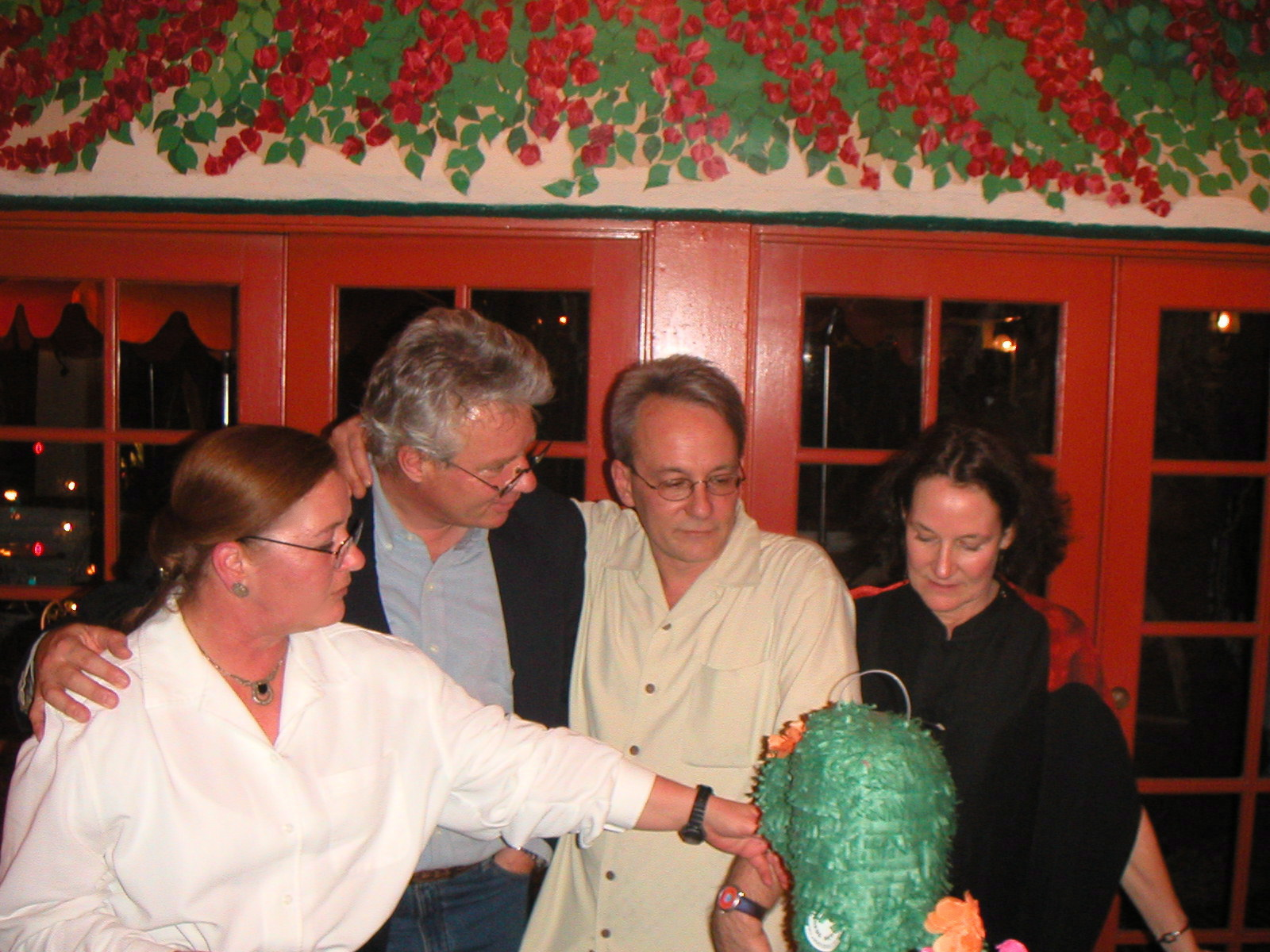
Ihor R. Lemischka (2nd from right) in San Diego

Ihor R. Lemischka was an American stem cell biologist and stem cell research advocate and was both the Lillian and Henry M. Stratton Professor of Gene and Cell Medicine and Director of the Black Family Stem Cell Institute at Mount Sinai Medical Center in New York City.

His work with hematopoietic stem cells (HSC) was the first to identify their novel receptor tyrosine kinases and showed that HSC can rebuild all blood cell types in a mouse whose blood cells had been destroyed.

He authored over 70 book chapters and publications in peer-reviewed journals.

== Biography ==
=== Education and post-doctoral training ===
Lemischka graduated from Johns Hopkins University in 1976 and earned his Ph.D. in biology from MIT in 1983. He did his post-doctoral training at MIT's Whitehead Institute.

=== Academic appointments ===
Lemischka joined Princeton University in 1986 as Assistant Professor of Molecular Biology; he became Professor in 2002. In 2007, he joined the staff at Mount Sinai Medical Center, where he was Professor of Gene and Cell Medicine and Director of the Black Family Stem Cell Institute.

=== Affiliations and awards ===
Lemischka was a board member of the International Society for Stem Cell Research, the Journal of Visualized Experiments (JoVE) and the New York Stem Cell Foundation. His awards included a Damon Runyon-Walter Winchell Postdoctoral, a Leukemia Social Special Fellowship, an American Cyanamid Preceptorship Award and the DuPont Young Faculty Grant. He was a journal reviewer for Cell, Science, Nature, Nature Genetics, Nature Immunology, Nature Biotechnology, Proceedings of the National Academy of Sciences, Public Library of Science, Development, Genes & Development, Journal of Clinical Investigation and Blood.

=== Patents ===
Lemischka held or had patents pending for the following:

Patent Number	Title
7465464	Populations of cells that express flk-2 receptors
7445798	Populations of cells that express FLK-1 receptors
6960446	Method for isolating cells expressing flk-2
6677434	Soluble human flk-2 protein
6613565	Use of delta-like protein to inhibit the differentiation of stem cells
5912133	Method for isolating stem cells expressing flk-1 receptors
5747651	Antibodies against tyrosine kinase receptor flk-1
5621090	Nucleic acids encoding soluble human FLK-2 extracellular domain
5548065	Tyrosine kinase receptor human flk-2-specific antibodies
5367057	Tyrosine kinase receptor flk-2 and fragments thereof
5283354	Nucleic acids encoding hematopoietic stem cells receptors flk-1
5270458	Nucleic acids encoding fragments of hematopoietic stem cell receptor flk-2
5185438	Nucleic acids encoding hencatoporetic stem cell receptor flk-2

=== Areas of concentration ===
Lemischka's interests included defining the cellular and molecular mechanisms that control cell fate decisions in embryonic stem cells. Research into mouse embryonic stem cells was aggressively studied in the embryonic stem cells of humans.

== Publications ==
Partial List:

- Fasano CA, Dimos JT, Ivanova NB, Lowry N, Lemischka IR, Temple S (June 2007). "shRNA knockdown of Bmi-1 reveals a critical role for p21-Rb pathway in NSC self-renewal during development". Cell Stem Cell. 1 (1): 87–99. doi:10.1016/j.stem.2007.04.001. PMID 18371338. (Retracted, see doi:10.1016/j.stem.2023.05.009, PMID 37267919)
- Ivanova N, Dobrin R, Lu R; et al. (August 2006). "Dissecting self-renewal in stem cells with RNA interference". Nature. 442 (7102): 533–8. Bibcode:2006Natur.442..533I. doi:10.1038/nature04915. PMID 16767105.
- Moore KA, Lemischka IR (March 2006). "Stem cells and their niches". Science. 311 (5769): 1880–5. Bibcode:2006Sci...311.1880M. doi:10.1126/science.1110542. PMID 16574858.
- Schaniel C, Li F, Schafer XL, Moore T, Lemischka IR, Paddison PJ (May 2006). "Delivery of short hairpin RNAs--triggers of gene silencing--into mouse embryonic stem cells". Nat. Methods. 3 (5): 397–400. doi:10.1038/nmeth0506-397. PMID 16628211.
- Pritsker M, Ford NR, Jenq HT, Lemischka IR (May 2006). "Genomewide gain-of-function genetic screen identifies functionally active genes in mouse embryonic stem cells". Proc. Natl. Acad. Sci. U.S.A. 103 (18): 6946–51. Bibcode:2006PNAS..103.6946P. doi:10.1073/pnas.0509861103. PMC 1458999. PMID 16621925.
- Shen Q, Wang Y, Dimos JT; et al. (June 2006). "The timing of cortical neurogenesis is encoded within lineages of individual progenitor cells". Nat. Neurosci. 9 (6): 743–51. doi:10.1038/nn1694. PMID 16680166.
- Pritsker M, Doniger TT, Kramer LC, Westcot SE, Lemischka IR (October 2005). "Diversification of stem cell molecular repertoire by alternative splicing". Proc. Natl. Acad. Sci. U.S.A. 102 (40): 14290–5. Bibcode:2005PNAS..10214290P. doi:10.1073/pnas.0502132102. PMC 1242282. PMID 16183747.
- Ivanova NB, Dimos JT, Schaniel C, Hackney JA, Moore KA, Lemischka IR (October 2002). "A stem cell molecular signature". Science. 298 (5593): 601–4. Bibcode:2002Sci...298..601I. doi:10.1126/science.1073823. PMID 12228721.
- Phillips RL, Ernst RE, Brunk B, Ivanova N, Mahan MA, Deanehan JK, Moore KA, Overton GC, Lemischka IR (2000). "The Genetic Program of Hematopoietic Stem Cells". Science. 288 (5471): 1635–1640. Bibcode:2000Sci...288.1635P. doi:10.1126/science.288.5471.1635. PMID 10834841.
- Petrenko O, Beavis A, Klaine M, Godin I, Lemischka IR (1999). "The molecular characterization of the fetal stem cell marker AA4". Immunity. 10 (6): 691–700. doi:10.1016/S1074-7613(00)80068-0. PMID 10403644.
