= Jan Zaprudnik =

Belarusian-American historian (1926–2022)

- Янка Запруднік
- Born: Siarhej Vilčycki; August 9, 1926; Mir, Poland (now Belarus)
- Died: 26 May 2022 (aged 95); Somerset, New Jersey, U.S.
- Occupations: Historian and publicist
- Awards: Belarusian Democratic Republic 100th Jubilee Medal (2018)

Jan Zaprudnik (Note: Belarusian: Янка Запруднік, romanized: Yanka Zaprudnik, polonized: Janka Zaprudnik) (9 August 1926 – 26 May 2022, born Siarhej Vilčycki) (Note: Belarusian: Сяргей Вільчыцкі, romanized: Syarhyey Vil′chytski, polonized: Siarhej Vilčycki) was a Belarusian-American historian and publicist. He was also one of the leaders of the Belarusian community in the United States and an honoured member of the Belarusian PEN-centre.

== Biography ==
Jan Zaprudnik was born into a family of school teachers in what was then the Second Polish Republic. During the Occupation of Belarus by Nazi Germany, Zaprudnik graduated from the Gymnasium in Baranavičy and studied at a high school there.

In 1944, Jan Zaprudnik fled to Germany because of his likely persecution for collaboration with invaders by Soviet authorities.

In 1954, he graduated from the history faculty of the Catholic University of Leuven in Belgium. Later he worked for the Belarusian service of Radio Free Europe.

In 1957, Jan Zaprudnik moved to the United States and was a member of the Rada of the Belarusian Democratic Republic working "to ensure that the world did not forget about the Belarusians and their right to their own independent state".

In 1969, he received a doctorate in history from New York University about Belarusian representatives in the State Duma of the Russian Empire at the beginning of the 20th century and later worked as a professor in history at several universities.

== Works ==
Jan Zaprudnik started his publishing in 1947. During his life, he was a correspondent and an editor of many periodicals of the Belarusian diaspora, including the English-language Journal of Belarusian Studies.

Main works in English are:

- Belarus: At a Crossroads in History (1993, ISBN 0-8133-1794-0)
- Historical Dictionary of Belarus (1998, ISBN 0-8108-3449-9)

== Recognition ==
Zaprudnik was awarded a Belarusian Democratic Republic 100th Jubilee Medal.
