= Wild Fermentation =

- Cover of first edition
- Author: Sandor Katz
- Language: English
- Subject: Fermentation
- Publisher: Chelsea Green Publishing
- Publication date: September 2003; 2nd edition 2016
- Publication place: United States
- Media type: Print (Paperback)
- ISBN: 9781603586283
- OCLC: 51967139
- Dewey Decimal: 641.7 21
- LC Class: TP371.44 .K37 2003

Wild Fermentation: The Flavor, Nutrition, and Craft of Live-Culture Foods is a 2003 book by Sandor Katz that discusses the ancient practice of fermentation. While most of the conventional literature assumes the use of modern technology, Wild Fermentation focuses more on the practice and culture of fermenting food.

The term "wild fermentation" refers to the reliance on naturally occurring bacteria and yeast to ferment food. For example, conventional bread making requires the use of a commercial, highly specialized yeast, while wild-fermented bread relies on naturally occurring cultures that are found on the flour, in the air, and so on. Similarly, the book's instructions on sauerkraut require only cabbage and salt, relying on the cultures that naturally exist on the vegetable to perform the fermentation.

The book also discusses some foods that are not, strictly speaking, wild ferments such as miso, yogurt, kefir, and nattō.

Beyond food, the book includes some discussion of social, personal, and political issues, such as the legality of raw milk cheeses in the United States.

Newsweek has referred to Wild Fermentation as the "fermentation bible".
