= Belarusan-American Association =

- Беларуска-Амерыканскае Задіночаньне
- Abbreviation: BAZA
- Formation: July 31, 1949; 76 years ago
- Founded at: New York City, United States
- Type: Nonprofit organization Fraternal organization
- Purpose: Belarusian American activism
- Location: New York City
- Official language: Belarusian; English
- Chairperson: Natallya Fedarenka

Belarusan-American Association (Belarusian: Беларуска-Амерыканскае Задзіночаньне, Bielaruska-Amierykanskaje Zadzinočan'nje, BAZA) is a non-profit organization of Belarusians in the United States. In the United States, the Belarusan-American Association is a member organization of the Central and East European Coalition (CEEC), which coordinates the efforts of national ethnic organizations representing 20 million Americans, whose members continue to maintain strong cultural, economic, political, and religious ties to the countries of Central and East Europe.

== General information ==
Currently Belarusan-American Association, Inc. (BAZA) is the biggest and the oldest Belarusian organization in the USA.

The Association unites people of Belarusian descent, people who migrated from the territory located within ethnographic borders of Belarus and those related to Belarusians through marriage or though professional relations irrespective of party affiliation.

Hanna Surmach is the Chairperson of the Belarusan-American Association (BAZA) at present time.

== Creation of the Association ==
Belarusan-American Association (BAZA) was established in 1949 in New York City.

The first preparatory assembly of the Association was held in June, 1949 in Brooklyn, New York. On July 31, 1949, the second assembly took place in Manhattan, where the Belarusan-American Association was actually created. The cofounders of the Association were Mikola Garoshka, Mikola Darashevich, Uladzimir Mashanski, Janka Stankievich, Janka Nikhaenak, Aliaksandar Orsa and Mikhas Tuleyka. In 1950 the Association was officially registered in the State of New York.

== Organizational structure and chapters ==
Belarusan-American Association (BAZA) has of two structural levels: the National Headquarter and Chapters.

The National Headquarter, located in New York City, consists of the Board of Directors, which is the executive body of the Association.

The Board of Directors governs the policies of the organization and oversees functioning of the local Chapters.

There are seven local Chapters of Belarusan-American Association (BAZA):

- New Jersey Chapter;
- Ohio Chapter;
- Brooklyn, New York Chapter;
- Washington, D.C. Chapter;
- Connecticut Chapter;
- Southern California Chapter;
- South Florida Chapter.

Each chapter is governed by the locally elected executive board that consists of the President, vice-president, Secretary and Treasurer, and other members.

== Newspaper Biełarus ==
The newspaper Biełarus is an official periodical of the Belarusan-American Association (BAZA). It was first issued on September 20, 1950, in New York City. Biełarus often publishes opinions of its readers on political and economical situations in Belarus.

== See also ==
- Belarusian Congress Committee of America
