= Charles Walters Jr. =

Charles Walters Jr. (June 18, 1926 – January 14, 2009) was an economist, journalist, publisher, editor, author, entrepreneur, and family farm advocate. A tireless advocate for "people's capitalism", Walters was a president of the National Organization for Raw Materials (NORM), a long-time executive board member, and founder and editor of Acres USA, the North American voice of eco-agriculture, organic farming, and the family farm.

== Early life ==
Charles Walters Jr. was born in Ness County, Kansas, to Carl and Dorothea Walters, poor farmers struggling to survive the Dust Bowl. Walters' childhood was shaped first by the Dust Bowl, then by the Great Depression. He came of age following military service in the waning days of World War II. Once discharged, he received his undergraduate degree from Creighton University and earned a master's degree in economics from University of Denver on the G.I. Bill.

As he made his way around several major urban centers before finally settling in Kansas City, Missouri, with his wife, Ann, Charles Walters never lost his connection to the world of farming. As an economist and the son of a dirt farmer during the Kansas dust bowl, it was not lost on him when a flood of corporate money pushed the American farmer into an expensive new dependence on farm machinery, synthetic fertilizers, and pesticides—about which little was known.

A turning point for him, as for many Americans, was the publication of Rachel Carson's Silent Spring in September 1962, which documented the detrimental effects pesticides were having on the environment. Carson's narrative would be the cornerstone of the point-of-view Walters would bring to his writings and social criticism.

== National Farmers Organization (NFO) ==
During the 1960s, Walters became associated with the National Farmers Organization (NFO) and edited the organization's news publication, NFO Reporter. He also supplied numerous articles on farm economics for the publication, observing and documenting many of the activities of the NFO. One of his books, Holding Action, discusses the events surrounding the milk holding actions of 1967.

== Raw Materials Economics ==
Professionally, Walters worked as an economist and journalist producing a number of books and essays. His main professional focus was on raw materials economics, greatly influenced by the works of Carl H. Wilken, Charles B. Ray, J. Carson Adkerson, and John Lee Coulter, four men who would later become known as the "Fathers of Raw Material Economics." Walters, too, must have made an impression, for he would later serve as a president of the National Organization for Raw Materials (NORM) and served on its executive board. He remained a member of NORM's executive Board until his death and has since joined its Hall of Fame.

1. Raw material economics is based upon a simple idea: that raw materials income from its farms, ranches, timberlands, oceans, mines, wells, and recycling centers governs national income unless the latter is expanded by debt; since agriculture is the largest producer of new raw materials each year, it is the largest annual source of raw materials income.
2. The health, robustness, and sustainability of the American economy is directly tied to the production of raw materials and the price at which those raw materials first enter into commercial channels. When raw materials enter trade channels at prices in balance with the prices of labor and capital, the economy operates on an earned-income basis with no buildup of public and private debt. Conversely, when raw materials enter trade channels at less-than-parity prices with labor and capital, the economy lacks sufficient earned dollars to operate on a debt-free basis; therefore, public and private debt accumulates.

Mentoring under Carl Wilken, Walters became the reference source on Raw Material Economics and the foremost authority about the raw materials equation. Early in his professional career, he witnessed the powerful array of professors, politicians, bankers, and free traders who undermined all efforts at educating the American public and its congressional and statehouse leaders about Raw Material Economics. His mentor, Carl Wilken, had spent more time testifying before Congress prior to this death than any other American, arguing the case of a change in banking policy that would make US capitalism a generative economy, rather than a predatory one – to no avail.

Over the course of time, Walters made a breakthrough. He realized how the methodical cheating of small farmers and the enforced swing toward chemical agriculture were gears in the same machine, working in tandem to transform the countryside – and not for the better. Corporate power and public policy were colluding in the destruction of the family farm, and the process was swift.

== Acres USA ==
In 1970, despondent with internal politics at the NFO, Walters founded Acres USA, a monthly magazine that promotes the family farm and organic farming and served as the executive editor for 28 years. Remembering the origins of Acres USA in 1995 for the journal's 25th anniversary issue, Walters said, "I didn't have the money to buy a paper, so I started one. I wanted the freedom that went with making my own decisions without the blessings of higher approved authority." Later, he assumed the status of editor emeritus while his son, Fred Walters, published the magazine from his home in Austin, Texas. Charles Walters Jr. remained in Kansas City, Missouri.

Yet, the enormity of the task did nothing to deter Walters and he spent more than 40 years focusing a journalistic spotlight upon the U.S. economy's downward spiral into public and private debt seemingly without end and tracing its origins to "free market" policies of cheap food and free trade.

Walter contributed to preserving organic farming principles prior to the widespread expansion of chemical-based agriculture in the United States. He compiled and published several volumes of research by Dr. William A. Albrecht, a University of Missouri professor of soil science. This work served as a foundation for the model that Acres U.S.A termed eco-agriculture.

Another important figure to the organic farming movement whose ideas had disappeared from public consciousness was that of Maynard Murray (1910–1983), a medical doctor and a pioneer in merging the disciplines of biology, health and agriculture as early as the 1930s when he began experimenting with "sea-solids" – mineral salts that remain after total sea water evaporation to reveal that trace minerals and other elements present in sea water were optimum for growth and health of both land and sea life. Acres published Murray's Sea Energy Agriculture in 1976 and again in 2001. Largely ignored during his lifetime, Murray's lifelong quest contributed greatly to our understanding of the role of trace minerals in the healthy growth of all organisms on the planet.

Acres USA was acquired by Swift Communications in 2016.

== Selected publications ==
In addition to writing and publishing hundreds of articles about Raw Material Economics in the pages of Acres USA, Walters authored three major works on the subject. His second book, Unforgiven (1971), now in its second edition (2003), is the definitive text on Raw Material Economics derived from in-depth interviews with Carl H. Wilken, shortly before Wilken's death in 1968.

A subsequent book, Raw Material Economics: A NORM Primer was published in 1982. This volume is still in print and updates the status of raw material economics into the mid-1980s. Walters also authored a paperback booklet entitled: PARITY—The Key to Prosperity Unlimited. The list below includes these publications and many others.

- Eco-Farm, An Acres U.S.A. Primer: The definitive guide to managing farm and ranch soil fertility, crops, fertilizers, weeds and insects while avoiding dangerous chemicals
- Weeds: Control Without Poisons
- Minerals for the Genetic Code: An Exposition & Analysis of the Dr. Olree Standard Genetic Periodic Chart & the Physical, Chemical & Biological Connection
- Grass, the Forgiveness of Nature
- Fertility from the Ocean Deep
- Unforgiven, The Story of How America Has Exchanged Parity Agriculture for Parity War
- Raw Materials Economics : A NORM Primer (1982)
- Reproduction and Animal Health
- Fletcher Sims' Compost
- The case for eco-agriculture
- Holding Action (1968)
- “The Birth of Raw Material Economics”
- “U.S. Economic Road Back To Stability Not Easy, But Possible”
- “Energy & Economics – Bound By Cycles and Natural Laws”
- “Long-Term Economic Cycles Ignore Short-Term Economic Indicators”

== The Charles Walters' Papers ==
The Charles Walters Papers (1937–2003, n.d.) are housed in the Special Collections Department at Iowa State University in Ames, Iowa. The papers contain correspondence and printed matter related to Walters' research, as well as copies of some of Walters' publications. Material related to the NFO includes correspondence, legal documents, printed matter, and includes both paper records and microfilm.

Over half of the collection is devoted to photographs documenting the activities of the NFO throughout the 1960s and 1970s. The photographs include images of members of the NFO leadership, conventions, holding actions and other activities sponsored by the NFO. The majority of the photographs were taken by Walters.
