= JoVE =

- Discipline: Life sciences, physical sciences
- Language: English

Publication details
- History: 2006–present
- Publisher: MyJove Corp.
- Frequency: Monthly
- Impact factor: 1.0 (2024)

Standard abbreviations
- ISO 4: J. Vis. Exp.

Indexing
- ISSN: 1940-087X
- LCCN: 2007216071
- OCLC no.: 122906325

Links
- Journal homepage

JoVE, formerly Journal of Visualized Experiments, is a peer-reviewed scientific journal that publishes experimental methods in video format. The journal is based in Cambridge, MA and was established in December 2006. Moshe Pritsker is the CEO and co-founder.

== Abstracting and indexing ==
JoVE is abstracted and indexed in Index Medicus, MEDLINE/PubMed, BIOSIS Previews, and Science Citation Index Expanded. According to the Journal Citation Reports, the journal had a 2024 impact factor of 1.0.

== Format and scope ==
JoVE covers research methods and experimental techniques from both the physical and life sciences. The journal currently has 13 sections: Biology, Developmental Biology, Neuroscience, Immunology and Infection, Medicine, Bioengineering, Engineering, Chemistry, Behavior, Environment, Biochemistry, Cancer Research, and Genetics. JoVE also publishes Science Education collections aimed at instructing scientists in fundamental concepts and methods in a range of fields including biology, chemistry, physics, psychology, and practical subjects like laboratory safety, cell culturing, and care of Drosophila flies.

== Function in replication ==
Some experiments can be difficult to replicate if they involve techniques that are unfamiliar or unusually sensitive, and a short written description of the original scientific methods might not be sufficient. JoVE videos are a step-by-step visual guide of the actual experiment so that the minute hand movements and other subtle manipulations necessary to perform the experiment successfully can be seen.

== Publication costs ==
JoVE originally started as a full open access publication, but switched to a subscription model in 2009. As of 2025, the cost of video production by JoVE to accompany a published text article is $2,400, (authors can instead opt to produce their own videos, but the fee remains the same). The journal has a hybrid open access option, which is an additional $1800, but does not include the professionally produced video in the open access content.
