= Sandor Katz =

American food writer (born 1962)

Sandor Ellix Katz
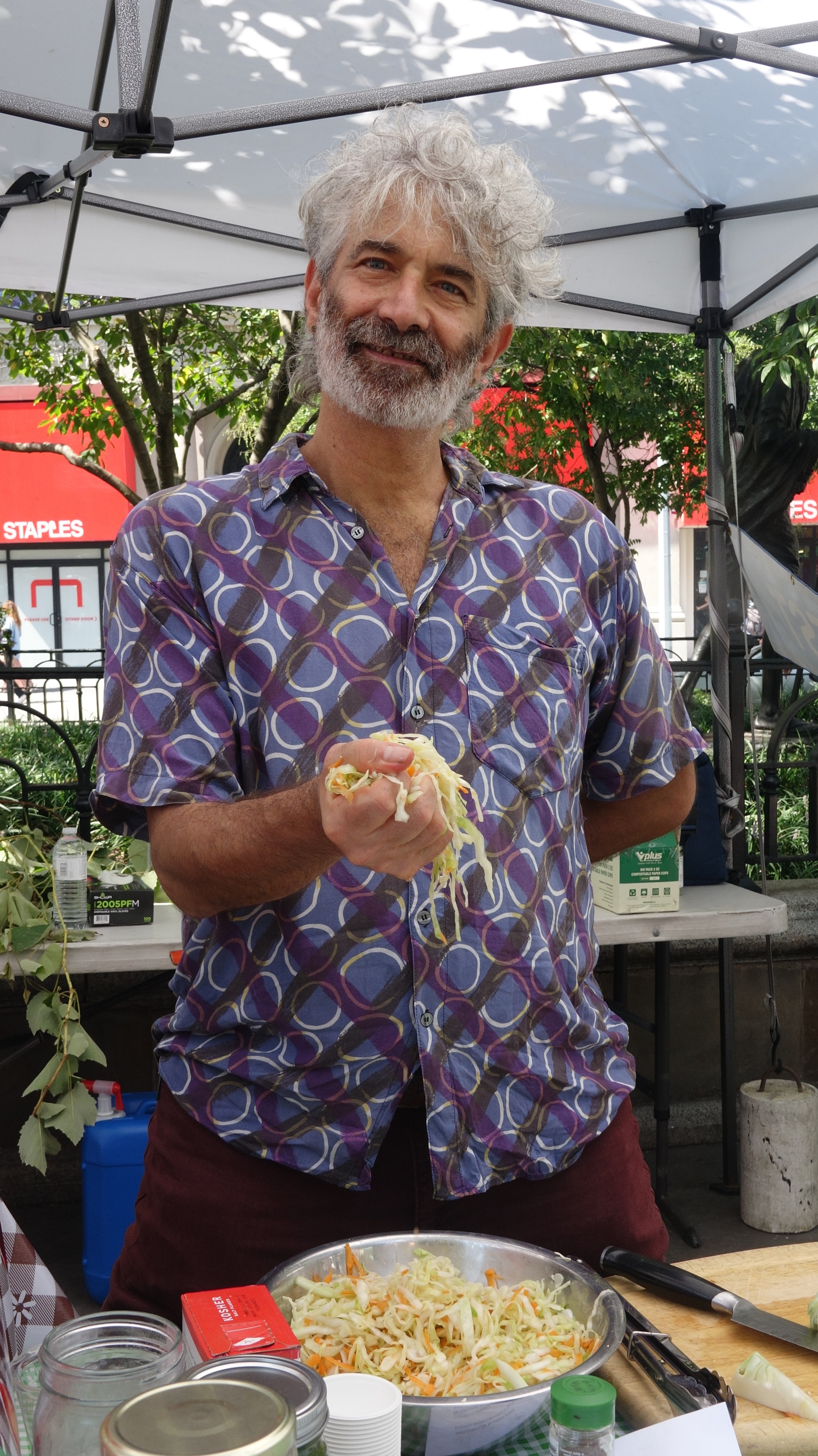
- Sandor Katz at the Fermentation Festival at Union Square in NYC in 2025
- Born: May 20, 1962 (age 64)
- Known for: Food writer focusing on DIY fermentation
- Notable work: Wild Fermentation (2003); The Art of Fermentation (2012)

Sandor Ellix Katz (born May 20, 1962) is an American food writer and DIY food activist.

== Work ==
A self-described "fermentation fetishist", Katz has taught hundreds of food workshops around the United States, and his book Wild Fermentation (2003) has been called a classic, "the bible for people embarking on DIY projects like sourdough or sauerkraut", and "especially notorious for getting people excited about fermenting food". He was named one of Chow magazine's top "provocateurs, trendsetters, and rabble-rousers" in 2009.

== Personal life ==
Born to an Ashkenazi Jewish family with origins in Eastern Europe, Katz grew up in New York City on the Upper West Side. His grandparents immigrated from Belarus in 1920, then part of the Soviet Union. He is openly gay, an AIDS survivor, and began his fermentation experimentation while living in a rural, off-the-grid Radical Faerie community in Tennessee.

== Popular culture ==
Katz was the subject of the 2009 punk rock song "Human(e) Meat (The Flensing of Sandor Katz)", a satirical vegan response to Katz's 2006 chapter on "Vegetarian Ethics and Humane Meat" in The Revolution Will Not Be Microwaved.

== Bibliography ==
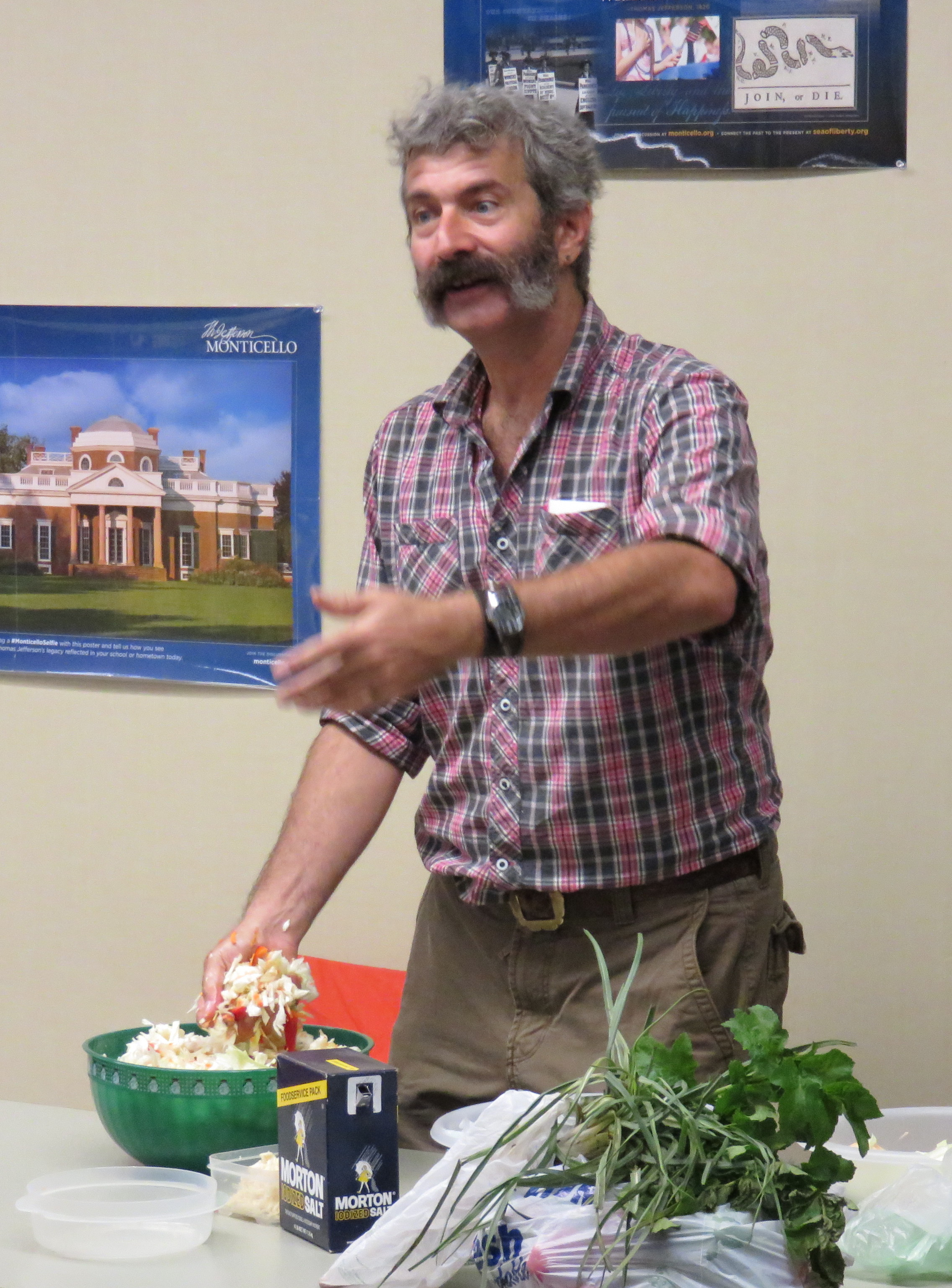
Sandor Katz doing a fermentation workshop at the Monticello Heritage Harvest Festival, 12 September 2015

- Katz, Sandor (1995). Anne Frank: Voice of Hope. (Junior World Biographies). Chelsea House Publishers. ISBN 0-7910-2120-3.
- Katz, Sandor (1996). Whoopi Goldberg: Performer with a Heart. (Junior Black Americans of Achievement). Chelsea House Publishers. ISBN 0-7910-2396-6.
- Katz, Sandor (2003). Wild Fermentation: The Flavor, Nutrition, and Craft of Live-Culture Foods. Chelsea Green Pub. ISBN 1-931498-23-7.
- Katz, Sandor Ellix (2006). The Revolution Will Not be Microwaved: Inside America's Underground Food Movements. White River Junction, Vt.: Chelsea Green Publ. ISBN 1933392118.
- Katz, Sandor (2012). The Art of Fermentation: An In-Depth Exploration of Essential Concepts and Processes from Around the World. Chelsea Green Publishing Company. ISBN 978-1603582865.
- Katz, Sandor (2021). Sandor Katz's Fermentation Journeys. Chelsea Green Publishing Company. ISBN 9781645020349.
