= Biełarus =

Belarusian-language American newspaper

- Editor-in-chief: Hanna Surmač
- Founded: 1950
- Country: United States
- Based in: New York City
- Language: Belarusian
- Website: www.bielarus.org
- ISSN: 1054-9455

Belarus (Belarusian: газэ́та «Белару́с», [ɣaˈzɛta bʲeɫaˈrus], literally, The Belarusian) is a Belarusian newspaper founded in the United States in 1950 by representatives of Belarusian post-war emigration. The periodical is published once every two months by the Belarusian-American Association in New York.

Belarus is the largest and the oldest Belarusian periodical outside Belarus. The materials include information about life and activism of Belarusian diaspora, Belarus-related news, and many historical and analytical materials. All materials of the periodical are published in Belarusian. Most Belarusian organisations in the world receive the newspaper on a subscription basis.

In terms of political orientation, the newspaper stays on the pro-Belarusian People's Republic, democratic and national revival position and is opposed to the politics of current Belarus president Alexander Lukashenko.

The newspaper was previously published monthly. As of 2015, it is published once every two months.

== Literature ==
- Беларус // Энцыклапедыя гісторыі Беларусі. У 6 т. Т. 1: А — Беліца / Беларус. Энцыкл.; Рэдкал.: М. В. Біч і інш.; Прадм. М. Ткачова; Маст. Э. Э. Жакевіч. — Мн.: БелЭн, 1993. – С. 346. — 494 с., [8] к.: іл. ISBN 5-85700-074-2.
- Беларус // Беларуская энцыклапедыя: У 18 т. / Рэдкал.: Г. П. Пашкоў і інш.. — Мн.: БелЭн, 1996. — Т. 2: Аршыца — Беларусцы. — С. 388–389. — 480 с. — ISBN 985-11-0061-7 (т. 2), ISBN 985-11-0035-8.
- Юрэвіч, Л. Летапісны звод сусьвету Чалавека Сьведамага: Гісторыя газэтаў «Бацькаўшчына» й «Беларус» (1947—2000) / Лявон Юрэвіч. — Мн.: Беларускі кнігазбор, 2006. — 256 с. — (Бібліятэка Бацькаўшчыны; Кн. 8). — ISBN 985-504-037-6.
