= Chelsea Green Publishing =

American book publisher focusing on the environment

- Founded: 1984; 42 years ago in Chelsea, Vermont, USA
- Founder: Ian Baldwin, Margo Baldwin
- Country of origin: United States
- Headquarters location: 85 North Main Street; White River Junction, Vermont
- Distribution: self-distributed (US); Footprint Books (Australia); University of Toronto Press Distribution (Canada); Real Books (South Africa); Publishers Group UK (UK)
- Publication types: Books
- Nonfiction topics: progressive politics and sustainable living
- Owner: ESOP
- Official website: chelseagreen.com

Chelsea Green Publishing is an American publishing company that specialises in non-fiction books on progressive politics and sustainable living. Based in Vermont, it has published over 400 books since it was founded in 1984, and now releases between 25 and 30 titles each year.

== History ==
The company was started by Margo Baldwin and her husband Ian in 1984 two years after moving from New York City to Chelsea, Vermont. They initially published books that appealed to their own interests, which included fiction, nature, travel, and art. Their first books were published in 1985—In a Pig's Eye, small-scale farmer Karl Schwenke's observations on "the human qualities of pigs and the piglike qualities of humans," and the first trade edition of Jean Giono's The Man Who Planted Trees, with woodcut illustrations by Michael McCurdy. Among the books that followed in the next two years were Permanent Parisians (a guide to Paris cemeteries), Words and Images of Edvard Munch, and Steve Heller's novel The Automotive History of Lucky Kellerman.

Not all of the books from their early, more eclectic range sold well, and the company was in financial difficulty by 1991. The Baldwins brought in Vermont business strategist Stephen Morris, who advised them to focus on a particular niche, sustainable living, and to build up a backlist that would keep selling over the years. He also negotiated a partnership with the Real Goods Trading Company, a California-based company whose customers were interested in living off the grid or with a low environmental impact, in which Real Goods bought Chelsea Green's books at steep discounts and then marketed them through their catalog, enabling them to reach a wider audience. Titles published by Chelsea Green in this area have included Alan Scott's The Bread Builders: Hearth Loaves and Masonry Ovens, Sandor Katz's Wild Fermentation, and Athena Swentzell Steen, Bill Steen and David Bainbridge's The Straw Bale House. First published in 1994, The Straw Bale House proved to be one of the company's best-selling books in their sustainable living list, with 100,000 copies sold over the next five years, even though there were only between 1,000 and 2,000 straw bale houses in the United States at the time. Morris became Chelsea Green's CEO in 1998, as Ian Baldwin had begun pursuing a career as an artist and was increasingly involved in founding the non-profit Marion Institute. When Morris stepped down as CEO in 2002, Margo Baldwin took over the post.

Under Margo Baldwin, Chelsea Green increasingly broadened their range to encompass books on progressive politics and environmental issues, a process that had already begun in 1992 with the publication of Beyond the Limits. They have since published George Lakoff's Don't Think of an Elephant, Naomi Wolf's The End of America, and Robert Kuttner's Obama's Challenge, all of which made The New York Times bestseller list. Other books published by Chelsea Green in this area have included Diane Wilson's An Unreasonable Woman and Edward Hoagland's Sex and the River Styx, which won the 2012 John Burroughs Medal for Distinguished Natural History Book. In 2008, Chelsea Green's pre-publication of Obama's Challenge drew protest from some independent and chain book sellers. Unable to print it before the 2008 Democratic National Convention, Chelsea Green made an exclusive agreement with Amazon to release it on a print-on-demand basis for two weeks in August and distributed discount vouchers to the convention delegates. In retaliation, Barnes & Noble said they would substantially reduce their 10,000-copy order and would sell the book only via their website, not in their stores. The book was released to retailers in September in an initial print run of 75,000 copies, which Chelsea Green said was the largest in their company's history.

In 2012, the company began transferring the majority of its ownership to its employees through an employee stock ownership plan. Three years later, 78% of Chelsea Green's stock was owned by its employees, with the Baldwins retaining the remaining 22%. In 2014, their 30th anniversary year, the company published The Chelsea Green Reader, an anthology of excerpts from books they had published during their first 30 years, encompassing poetry, fiction, memoir and biography, nature, travel, food and food culture, and environmental and economic policy. In 2015 they published Jonathan Tasini's The Essential Bernie Sanders, the first book-length treatment of Bernie Sanders' political agenda.

Chelsea Green's books for children include natural craft books, the Gaia Girls environmental fantasy series by Lee Welles, and Patrick's Great Grass Adventure (2017) by Joel and Rachel Salatin about a pigeon and a grass-farmer.
