= Manor houses of Polish-Lithuanian nobility =

Manor houses owned by the nobility of the Polish–Lithuanian Commonwealth

The manor houses of Polish-Lithuanian nobility (Note: Polish: dwór, lit. 'court'; Lithuanian: dvaras; Belarusian: сядзіба, romanized: siadziba. The term dwór corresponds with historical usage of 'court' in reference to manor houses in English.) are mansions that were historically owned by the szlachta of the Polish–Lithuanian Commonwealth, and later by Polish and Lithuanian nobles between the Partitions of Poland and the aftermath of World War II.

The architectural form of the manor house evolved around the late Polish Renaissance period and continued until the Second World War, which, together with the communist takeover of Poland and Soviet occupation of Lithuania, spelled the end of the nobility in both nations. A 1944 decree nationalized most mansions as property of the nobility; few were adapted to other purposes and many slowly fell into ruin. A vast majority of such mansions remain unused and are slowly deteriorating.

== Architectural history ==
Noble manors in Poland were typically small to medium-sized residencies for the landed gentry. According to estimates, in the 16th century, Greater Poland alone had several hundred to a thousand middle szlachta manors, while the entire Crown of the Kingdom of Poland had at least a dozen thousand.

During the times of the Polish–Lithuanian Commonwealth, Polish-Lithuanian nobility built manor houses in the countryside. This was a preferred location for one's residence, as the nobility, following the sarmatism ideology, felt contempt for the cities, even though members of this elite also had residences in a major city or town (but these were large lateral apartments rather than townhouses).

Examples of manor house elements
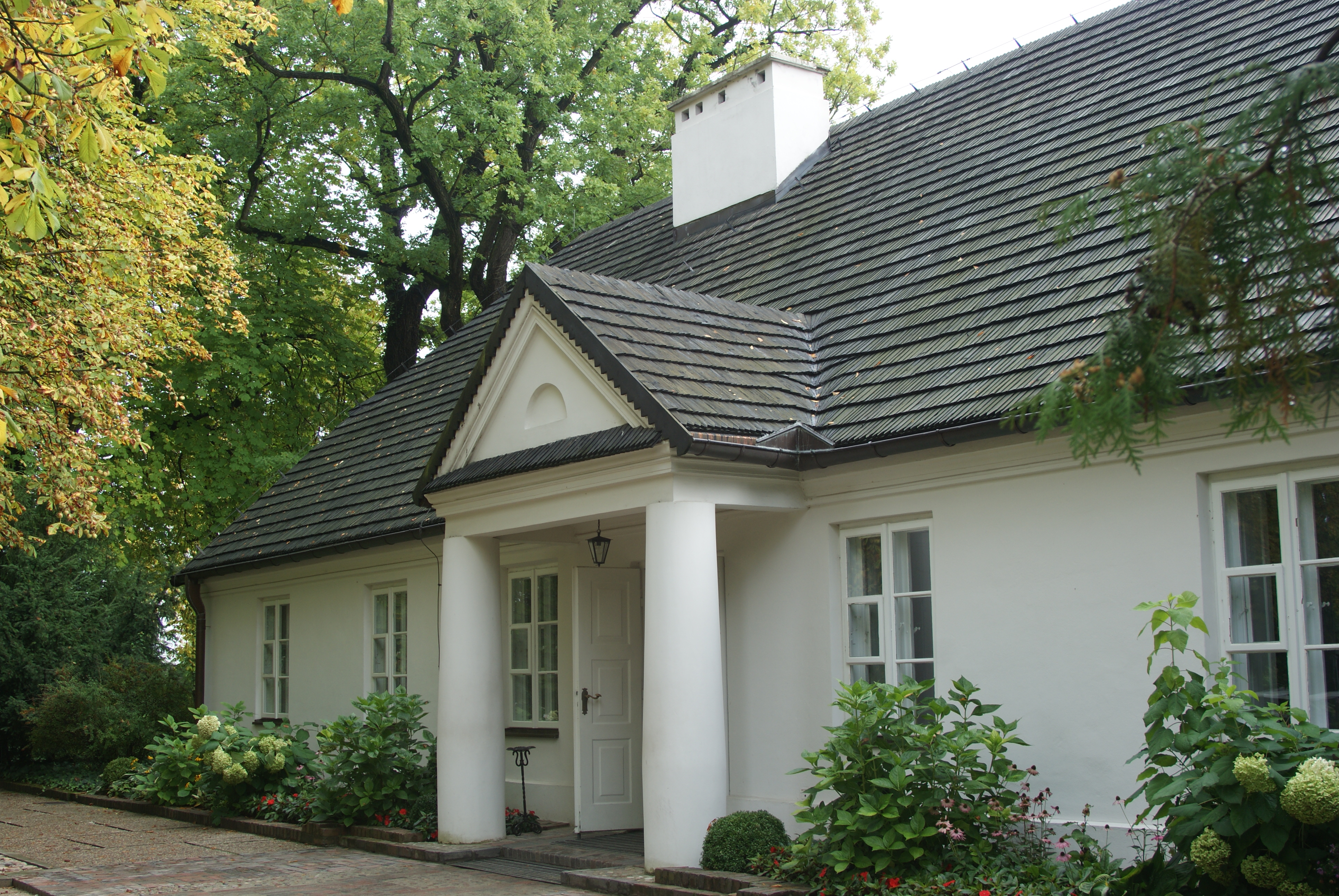
Żelazowa Wola, the birthplace of Frédéric Chopin - one of two minor outbuildings of the manor house

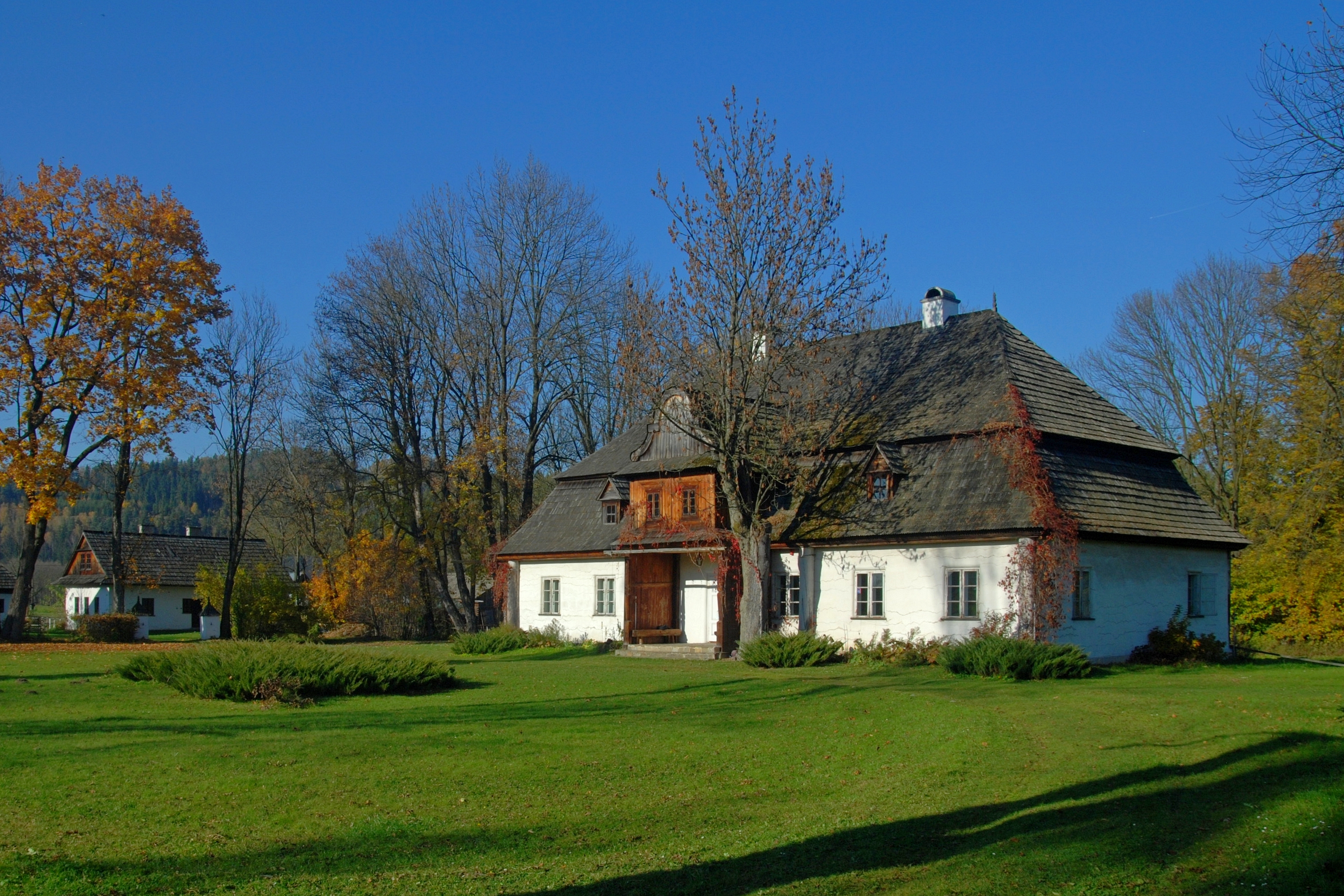
A large manor in Łopuszna with a mansard roof, typical of the manors

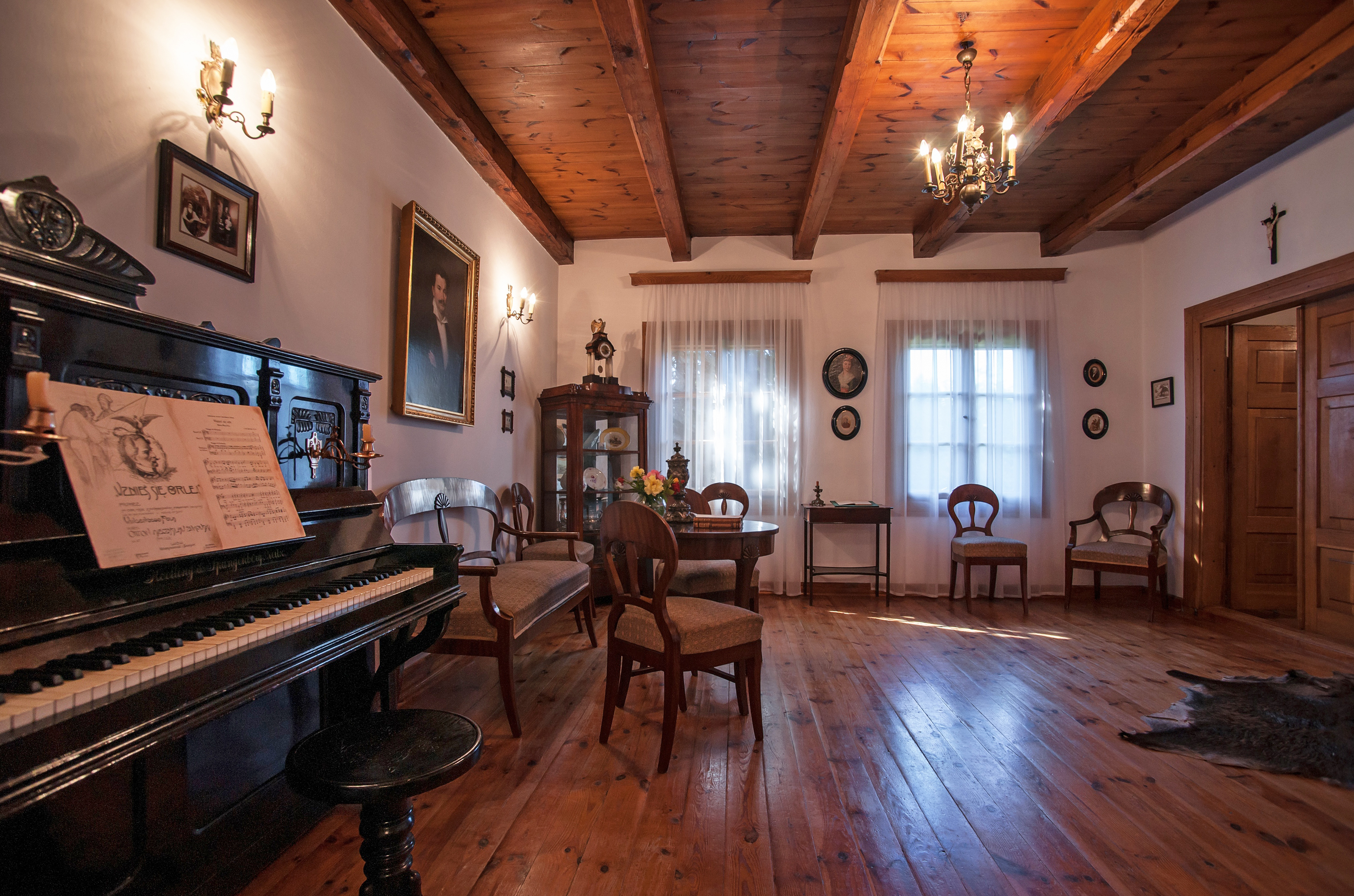
Interior of a manor-house that once belonged to Wincenty Pol, Lublin

An early 20th-century photo of the interior of a manor house in Bohdanowo, in present day Vishnyeva

The vast majority of such countryside manors in the beginning were made of wood. They tended to fall into two types: rare palaces of the magnates, and smaller, one-story houses, in which wood was the most common building material. Starting with the Renaissance period, mansions built with masonwork appeared, often designed to enhance their defensive characteristics. Although early on, such mansions were often designed as defensive mini-fortresses, over time - around the baroque period - the defensive function began to disappear.

The smallest ones had two to four rooms. Larger ones would have many more, including guest rooms and a chapel. Magnates' palaces would even boast their own opera house. Common furniture included benches, cupboards, tables, beds and small chairs, commonly made from tilia wood. Rarer furniture would include chests and wardrobes. Furniture was often painted (green being the most common color), sometimes engraved and inlaid. Walls were often painted with floral or moral and historical motifs, and decorated with Oriental (Persian, Turkish) or West European (Belgian, Flemish, French) tapestries and rugs, coats of arms, portraits, mirrors, weapons and trophies. Floors were wooden. Ceilings were carved and decorated with various hanging decorations (including candelabras). Windows in the richest mansions would be fitted with Venetian glass, and the rest would use green glass or waxed canvas. Stoves were common. Depending on a family's wealth, they would be made of materials from rough earthenware to porcelain and alabaster.

Early renaissance mansions were based on a rectangular design, with corner chambers (alkierze) and a porch. The roof was a Polish variant of the hip roof (termed Łamany dach polski – the broken Polish roof) covered with shakes. In the baroque period, alkierze were replaced by risalits, and mansard roofs appeared. The Classicism period saw porches replaced by porticos with tympanums.

Over time, Polish manors adopted a palace-villa form with Baroque and Palladian style elements. As Polish architectural writing developed, their design became more standardized. The first Polish architectural treatise, from around the mid-17 century, included instructions for building early modern manors. (Note: In 1659, Opaliński published his pioneering the 'Brief Study of the Construction of Manor Houses, Palaces, and Castles According to the Polish Sky [or Heavens] and Customs' (Polish: Krótka nauka budownicza dworów, pałaców, zamków podług nieba i zwyczaju polskiego).)

Manors were constructed across Poland not only in rural areas but also in cities, particularly in Warsaw, where they remained the most popular type of residence from the 17-18th centuries until the 1830s.

== 19th–20th centuries ==
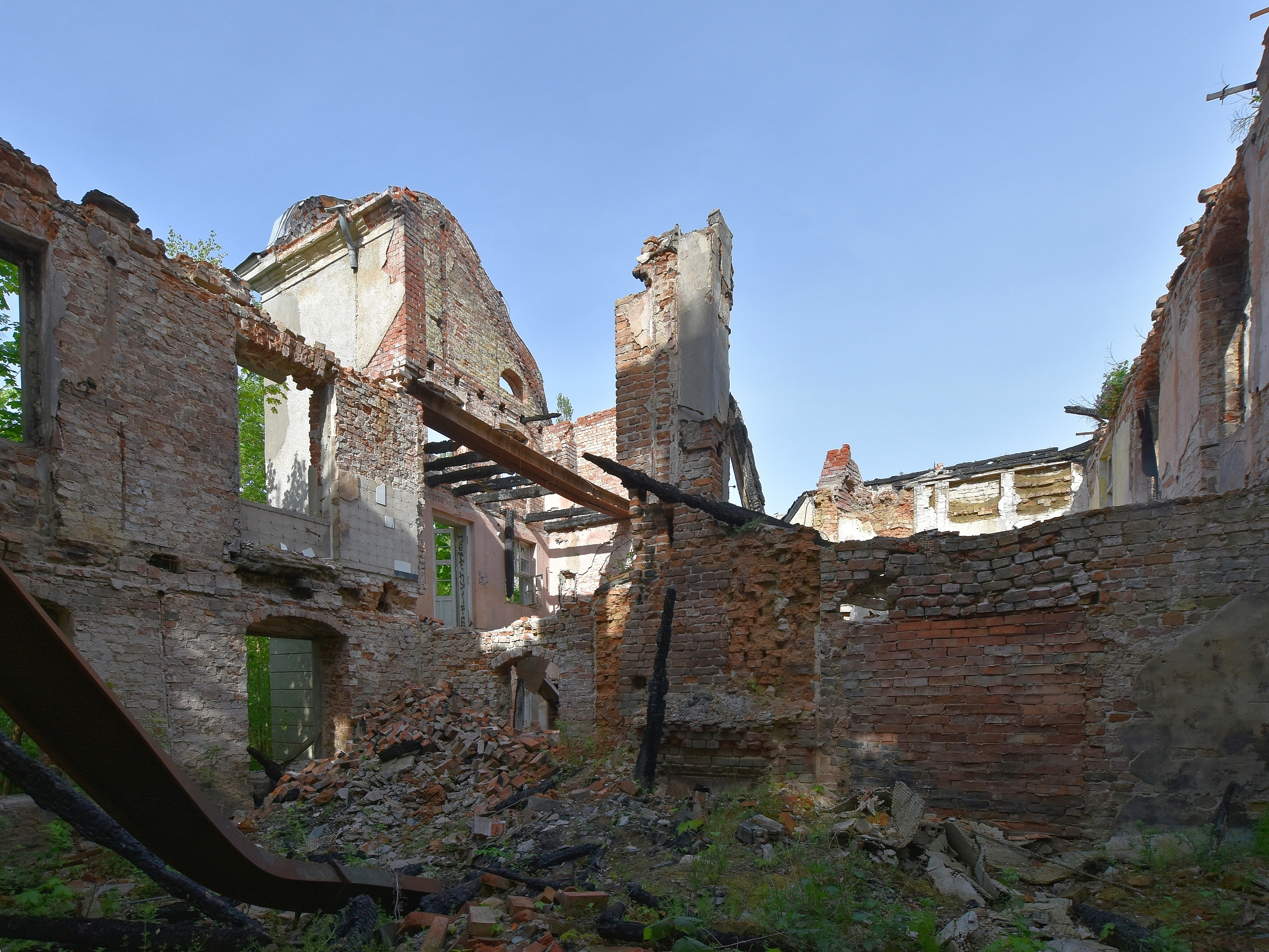
An abandoned manor in Wytowno, 2023

Since the 19th century, richer residences (palaces) were termed manors (Polish: dwór), while the more modest homes of provincial nobility were called little manors (Polish: dworek).

Many Polish and Lithuanian noble families lost their ancestral manor houses and lands after the failed uprisings against the Russian Empire, as Tsarist authorities confiscated manors owned by families who supported the uprisings.

In Lithuania, after the abolition of serfdom in 1861, many manor estates lost ownership of the nearby towns and villages, as peasants were no longer the property of the manor's lord. During the Lithuanian Land Reforms of 1922, almost every manor's land size was greatly reduced and the land was redistributed to landless peasants. After Lithuania was occupied by Soviets in 1944, the manor houses themselves and their remaining land were nationalized and repurposed, mostly as schools, living quarters or administrative centers of collective farms.

In Poland, the ideologically driven nationalization policies and architectural preservation guidelines enacted during the early years of the communist Polish People's Republic contributed to the destruction of many manor houses. Before World War II, there were tens of thousands of manors. Today, only over 2,000 remain, often in very poor condition.

== Influence ==
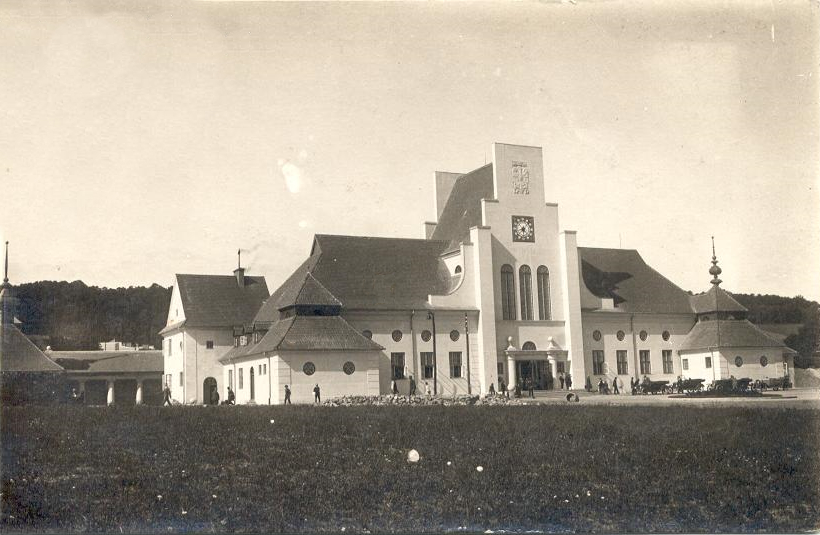
The railway station at Gdynia in manor style built in 1923 by architect Romuald Miller; destroyed during the Second World War; at the location of today's station Gdynia Główna.

Manor architecture influenced church buildings and, by the mid-19th century, impacted peasant and small-town architecture as well. Inns and smithies were built in a similar style. In the 17th and 18th centuries, a view emerged that identified the manor architecture with 'Polishness', treating it as 'native' and 'unique'. It gained particular traction in the 19th century during the period of Romanticism, leading to the creation of the dworek style (Polish: styl narodowy or styl dworkowy) — an urban or suburban villa from the first half of the 20th century, in which public utility buildings, such as railway stations, were also designed in Poland. The dworek style design was popular in the Second Polish Republic, and is still inspiring some modern Polish manors.

== See also ==
- Architecture in Belarus
- Houses in Poland
- Lithuanian architecture
- Polish architecture

== Bibliography ==
- Leśniakowska, Marta (1992). Polski Dwór. Wzorce architektoniczne. Mit. Symbol (in Polish). Instutut Sztuki Polskiej Akademii Nauk. ISBN 978-83-85938-66-8.
