= Saint Eufrosyne Monastery =

- Спаса-Ефрасіннеўскі манастыр (Belarusian); Спасо-Евфросиниевский монастырь (Russian)
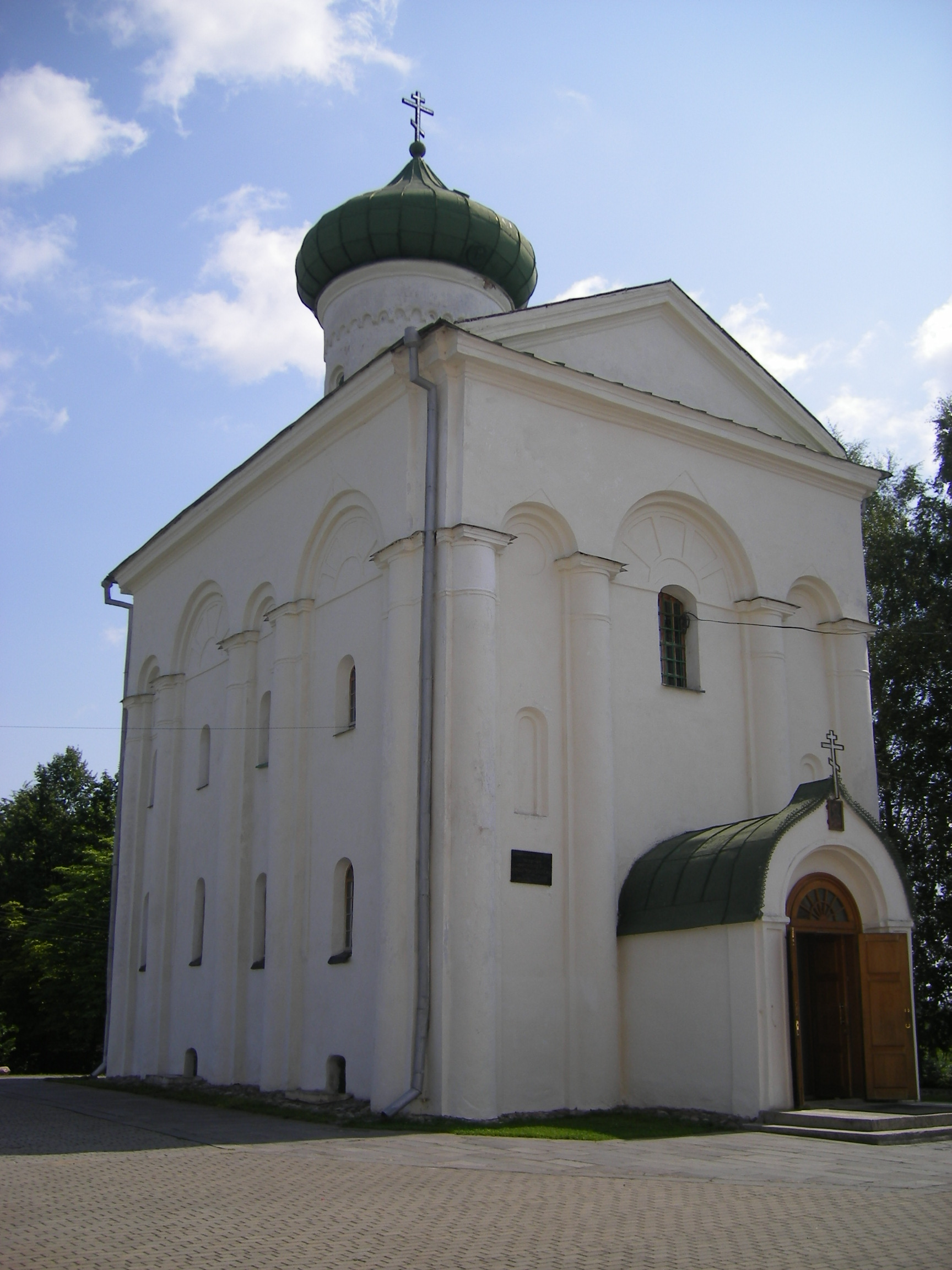
- Transfiguration Cathedral of the Saint-Euphrosyne Monastery
- Interactive map of Saint Eufrosyne Monastery

Monastery information
- Denomination: Orthodox
- Established: 1125
- Diocese: Polotsk Eparchy, Russian Orthodox Church

Site
- Location: Polotsk, Polotsk District, Vitebsk Region, Belarus
- Coordinates: 55°30′14″N 28°46′47″E

Saint-Euphrosyne Monastery (Belarusian: Спаса-Ефрасіннеўскі манастыр) is a women's Orthodox monastery in Polotsk, one of the oldest and largest centers of Orthodoxy in Belarus.

== History ==
=== Foundations ===
The monastery was founded by the holy princess Euphrosyne of Polotsk in 1128. Bishop Elias of Polotsk tasked Euphrosyne with setting up a women's monastery and she settled near the Transfiguration church in Selce. Over time, the sisters of St. Euphrosyne were tonsured: the native Evdokia (in the world of Gordislav) and the cousin Evpraksia (in the world of Zvenislav) - the only daughter of the Polotsk prince Boris Vseslavich.

Members of the monastery taught young women to copy books, sing, sew and do other handicrafts.

In 1161, with the zeal of St. Euphrosyne the Monk the stone Transfiguration Church was erected, the best preserved monument of the ancient Polotsk architecture.

Mother Euphrosynia in 1161 donated a gilt cross to the church. This cross known as the Cross of Saint Euphrosyne had relics of many saints and was carved in wood which is claimed to come from the Life-giving Cross of Christ. The cross was carved by the local master jeweler Lazar Bohsha. In the XIII century the cross was taken from Polotsk, but again returned to the monastery Ivan the Terrible in 1563 after the successful siege of the city.

=== Later history ===
In 1580, the monastery was given to the Jesuits after the capture of Polotsk by Stephen Bathory. In 1654, it was returned to Orthodoxy but in 1667, was again taken over by the Jesuits, who kept it until 1820, when they were expelled from Polotsk. In 1832 the monastery was transferred to the Orthodox Church and in 1840 it was restored. In 1841 the Cross of the Euphrosyne of Polotsk was returned to the Transfiguration Cathedral.

In the 1840s, the ancient monastery was ranked first-class. In the walls of the monastery the Saint Euhrosyne women's spiritual school was located. In 1847, with the Abbess of Claudia Schepanovsky, the construction of the Euphrosyne Refectory Church was started. It was opened on 5 June (23 May o.s.), 1858.

In 1897, under the abbess Yevgeniya Govorovich, a monumental five-domed Cross Exaltation Cathedral was erected, designed according to the design of architect V.F. Korshikov in the neo-Byzantine style.

In 1910, Euphrosyne's relics were returned to the monastery.

In 1921 the monastery was closed, the cross requisitioned, in 1928 was transported to Minsk, in 1929 to Mogilev. In 1941, during the Great Patriotic War, the Cross of Euphrosyne of Polotsk disappeared without a trace and has not yet been found. A recreation of the cross was given to the monastery in 1997.

== ´ Abbesses of the Monastery ==
1. Abbess Euphrosyne, Princess of Polotsk († 23 May / 5 June 1173)
2. Abbess Yevdokiya (the sister of Euphrosyne), Princess of Polotsk († c1180))
3. Abbess Paraskeva (Paraskevia), Princess of Polotsk († 1239)
4. Abbess Ulyaniya (Ulyana) (mentioned in 1552 and 1580)
5. Abbess Akilina (Oculina) († 10 / December 23, 1577)
6. Abbess Natalia († late 16th century)
7. Abbess Innokentiya (Kuleshov) (1841)
8. Abbess Yevfrosyniya (Dekhtyaryova) (1842-1843)
9. Abbess Claudia (Schepanovsky) (1843-1854)
10. Abbess Yevfrosyniya (Serbinovich) (1854-1878)
11. Abbess Yevgeniya (Govorovich) (1878-1900)
12. Abbess Olympiada (1900-1903)
13. Abbess Yevfrosiniya (Sladkevich) (1904-1905)
14. Abbess Ilariona (Chyornykh) (1905-1910)
15. Mather Angelina (Petrochenko) (1911-1913)
16. Abbess Elena (Volkova) (1913-1928) (?)
17. Abbess Ananias (Trofimova (?)
18. Abbess of Eleutheria (Novikov) (194 (?) - 1959)
19. Abbess Yevfrosiniya (Maksimchuk) (1991-1995)
20. Mother Natalia (Skinner) (1995-1997)
21. Abbess Anfisa (Sheverdyaeva) (1997-2004)
22. Abbess Yevdokiya (Levshuk) (2004–present)
