= St. Euphrosynia Belarusian Orthodox Church =

Greek Orthodox church in South River, New Jersey, US

Coordinates: 40.440214°N 74.365210°W

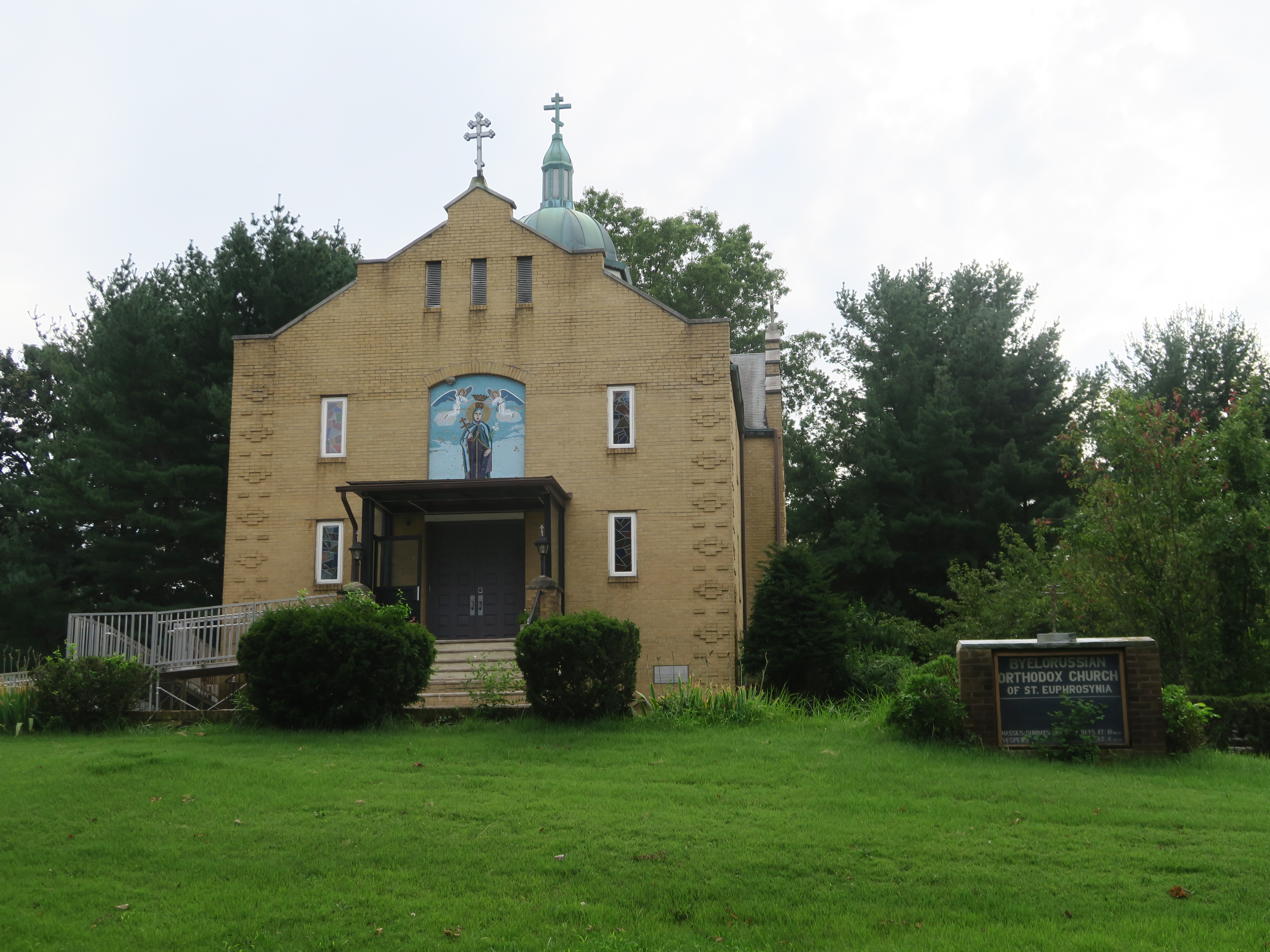
- Front of St. Euphrosynia Church

Religion
- Affiliation: American Carpatho-Russian Orthodox Diocese

Location
- Location: 284 Whitehead Avenue; South River, NJ 08882
- Interactive map of St. Euphrosynia Belarusian Orthodox Church

Architecture
- Type: Church
- Completed: 1950s

The St. Euphrosynia Belarusian Orthodox Church is a Belarusian Orthodox church in South River, New Jersey, a parish of the American Carpatho-Russian Orthodox Diocese of the United States. The head of the church is Rev. Fr. Konstanin Gavrilkin. It is named after Euphrosyne of Polotsk.

== History ==
After the end of World War II, Belarusian parishioners came together and worshiped in Displaced Person-Camps in Regensburg, Michelsdorf and Backnang, Germany. Some of the church members were able to move to the United States and moved to South River, New Jersey, where already a Belarusian community existed. In 1951 a parish council was elected, with Father Nikolai Lapitzki selected as its first pastor. The parish celebrated their first worship on the second floor of the Conklin Methodist Church, a local church, whose Rev. G. Nelson Moore allowed to use it. The Church Council became a member of the Greek Orthodox Archdiocese of North and South America. In 1953 the parish bought a former Jewish synagogue on Whitehead Avenue and converted it into an Orthodox Christian Church. In addition, the Church acquired a piece of land on Hillside Avenue for use as a parish cemetery.

== Saint Euphrosynia Belarus Orthodox Church Cemetery ==
The church serves as a cemetery for members of New Jersey's Belarusian-American community, including notable figures (e.g. BCC president Radasłaŭ Astroŭski) associated with Belarusian nationalist movements during and after World War II.

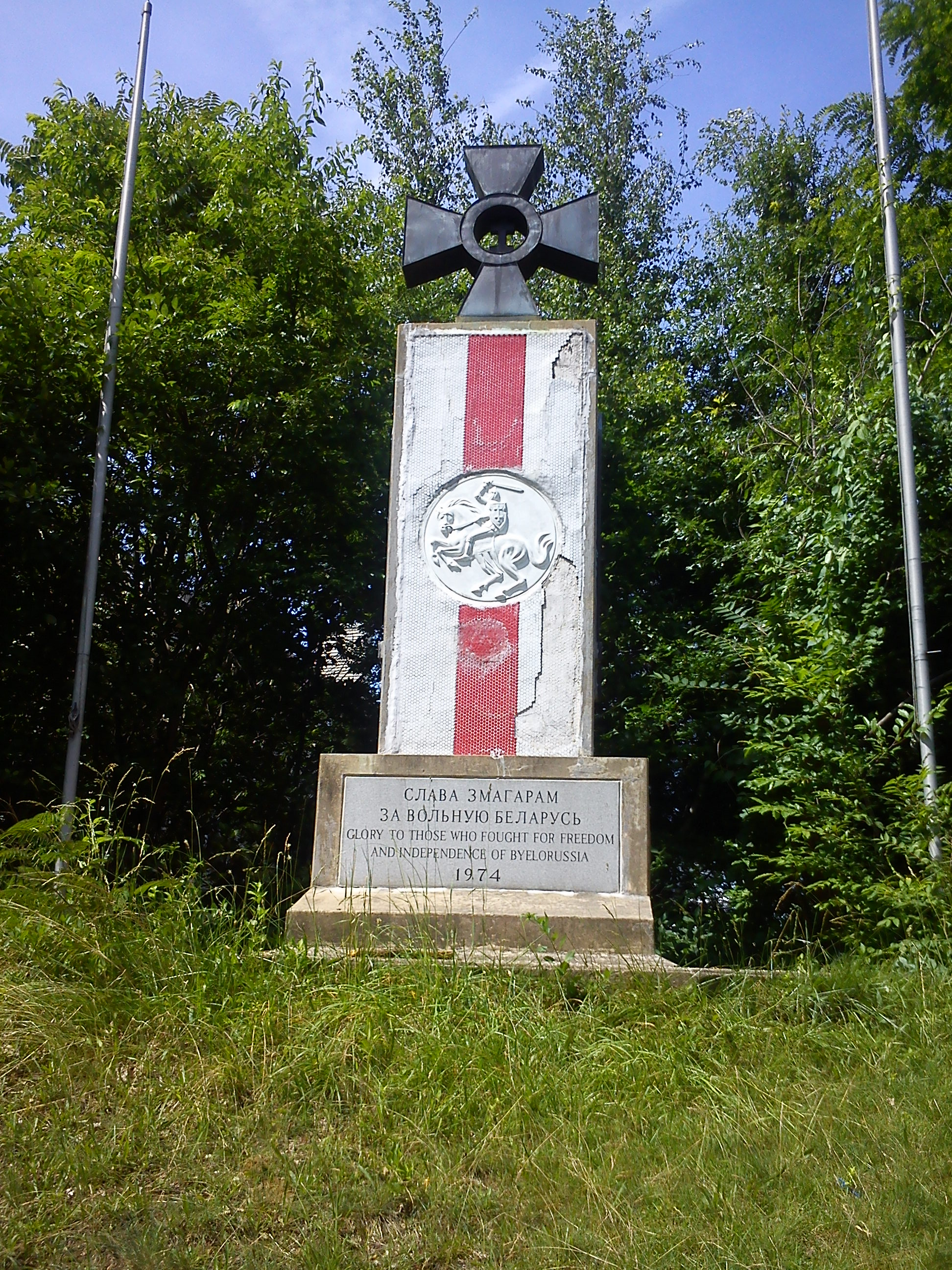
Monument to "Those who fought for Freedom and Independence of Byelorussia", created 1974

On a hilltop behind the St. Euphrosynia Belarusian Orthodox Church, a large memorial was installed bearing the official seal of the Byelorussian Central Council (Bielaruskaja Centralnaja Rada, or BCC) reads, "glory to those who fought for freedom and independence of Byelorussia." The stone memorial is topped by a large iron cross, with a small double-barred cross at its center, representing the Cross of Saint Euphrosyne and is a central element of the medieval Belarusian coat of arms, Pahonia.
