= Residential architecture in Poland =

Overview of Polish residential architecture

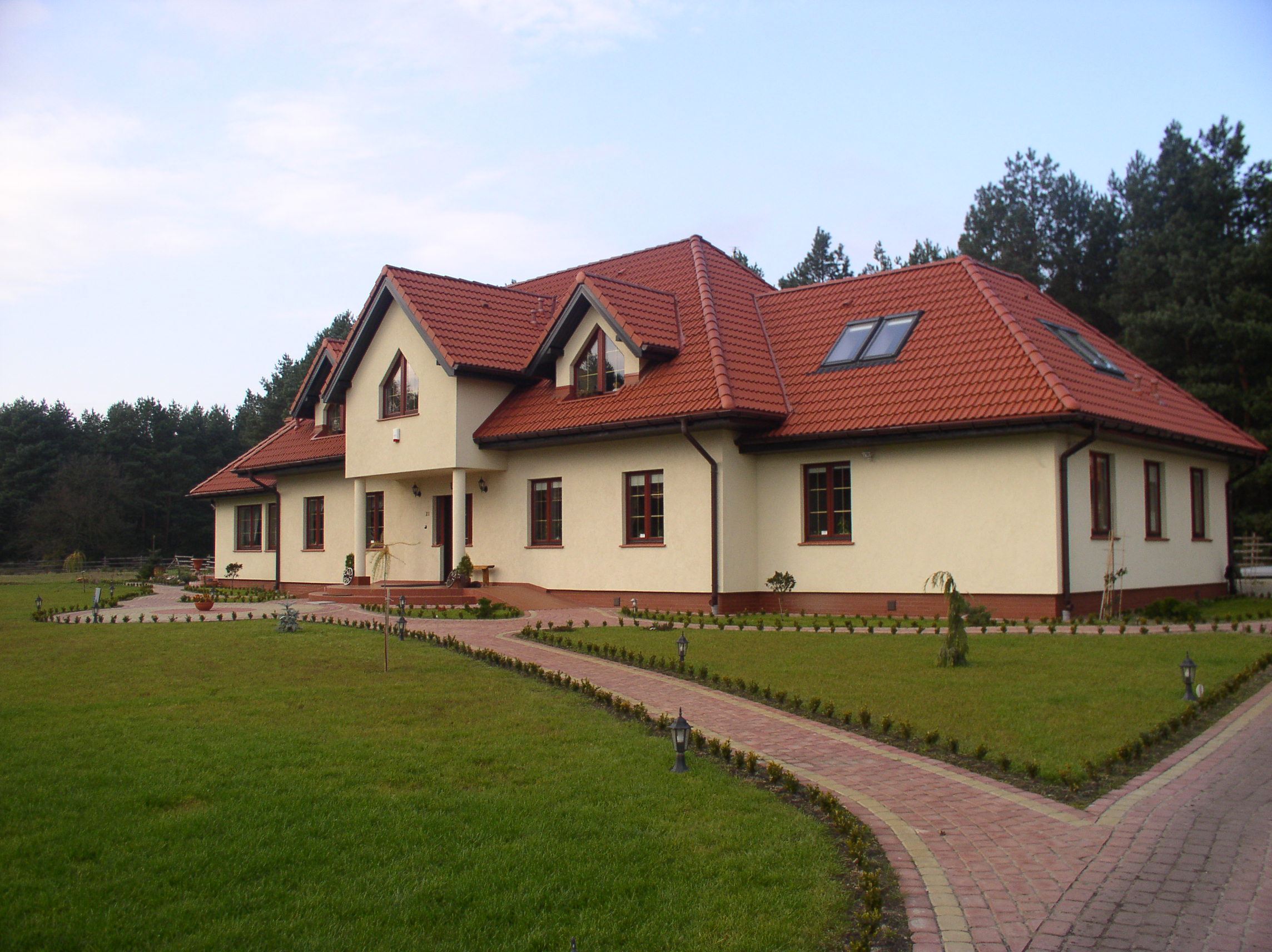
A residential country home in Poland. Approximately 51.2% of Poles resided in detached dwellings in 2025

Residential buildings in Poland are fundamentally divided into two main categories: single-family buildings (houses), and multi-family buildings (blocks of flats, apartment buildings). The former are meant to house only a small number of people, either one or a few families, while the latter are built with larger amounts of people living in their own separate areas of the same building in mind. There are also a few sub-categories, like multi-family houses (Polish: domy wielorodzinne), which can house multiple families, but don't have separate flats inside, and don't usually have separate entrances to the building. According to data from Eurostat to a 2025: 51.2% of Poles live in single-family detached houses, 33.6% live in flat in a building with ten or more dwellings, 9.1% live in Flat in a building with less than ten dwellings, 6% live in semi-detached houses, and 0.2% live in other types of buildings.

== Housing styles ==
During the times of the Polish–Lithuanian Commonwealth and the 19th century when Grand Duchy of Lithuania was united with Poland, the aristocracy built country palaces and manors. Members of this elite also had residences in major cities or towns but, as in France, these were large lateral apartments rather than town houses. Therefore houses built before the Second World War tend to fall into two types: palaces and 2-4 room wooden houses. In some towns such as Zakopane and Nałęczów stunning examples of town houses still exist but they are the exception rather than the norm.

After the Second World War brick built houses became more popular and led to a distinctive style during the 1960s and 1970s. In the last 25 years there has been exceptional growth in Polish wealth which has allowed many Poles to build their own property. Unlike many European countries there has been less pressure on land (until very recently) which has led to hundreds of thousands of new properties being constructed, mostly by the owner to their own specification although there is a certain style involved. This new wealth has also allowed many Poles to purchase recreational land for summer and weekend use. Here they often build smaller houses not meant for the winter.

== Residential houses ==
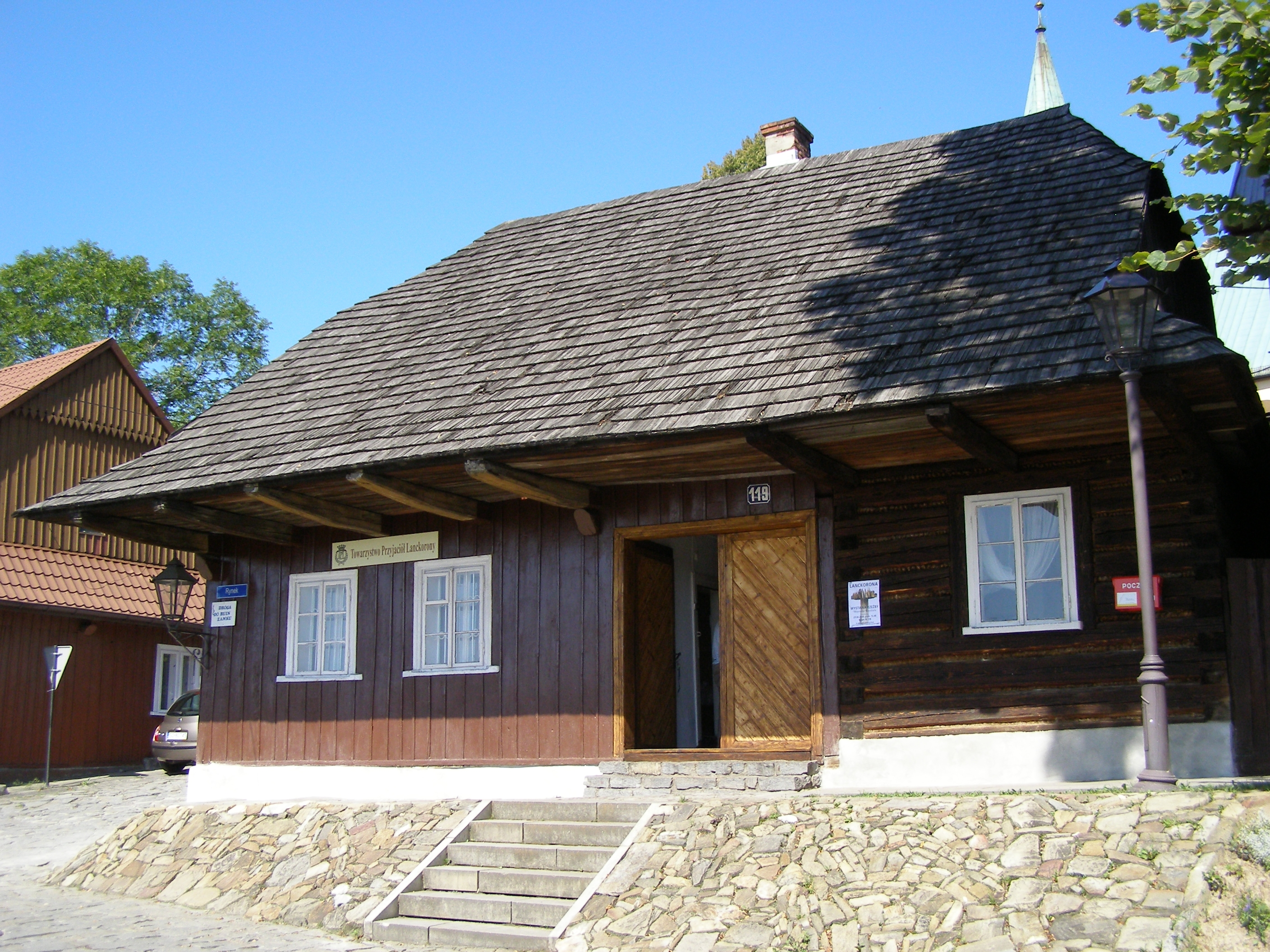
A historic Polish timber house

The pre-war stucco house is usually a one story bungalow. It will have a kitchen with a wood or coal burning stove that will also provide heat to the rest of the property. The windows are not double glazed in the usual sense but are of the traditional stucco. There is one window on the inside of the property opening inwards and one on the outside opening outwards. Some of these houses have been modernised to add internal bathrooms but mostly not, and so although they were once inhabited 12 months of the year many are now regarded as stucco houses suitable for weekend and summer use.

== 1960s and 1970s ==
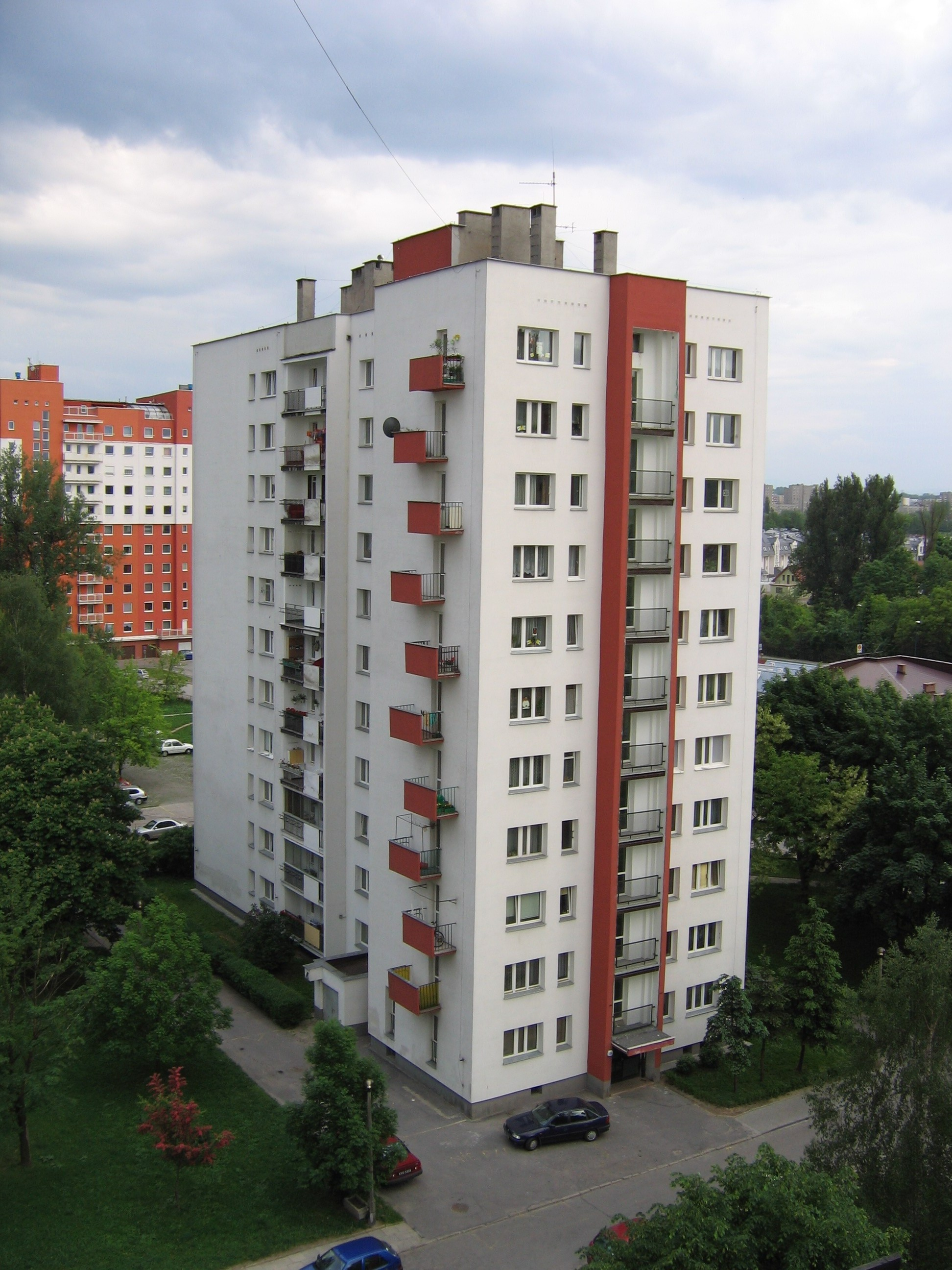
A typical Polish apartment block built in the 1970s

After the Second World War a growing middle class emerged in Poland and brick-built houses became popular. These are generally constructed out of large ceramic bricks (for good insulation) and the outside is then plastered over and painted.

Their layouts are broadly similar. There is a lower ground floor which is half below ground level and usually has small windows. Here there are storage rooms, sometimes a garage and often a second kitchen (or "summer kitchen"). The lower ground floor was used for drying meat, storing vegetables, etc., and acting as a useful insulation level. The "summer kitchen" is/was a space meant for the members of the household to spend time together in the summer and in warmer weather, cooking and entertaining each other, as well as for storage. It typically is not/was not used in cooler seasons. Those rooms are still useful; many of them are quite spacious and have their own external door, and so have been converted into offices for small businesses.

On the raised ground floor are the reception room, main kitchen, bathroom and bedrooms. These may not be the most picturesque of houses but the majority are solid, relatively well built and practical. These houses often don't have a front door in the front, but rather on the side of the house or even in the back – in the front there's usually just large windows.

Typically, Polish houses (both contemporary, more recently built ones, and older ones built in the 20th century) are surrounded by a fence. It is mostly for privacy and security reasons so nobody can enter the property uninvited. They usually have a big gate for cars to enter into the driveway (Polish: brama), and a smaller gate for people to enter into the front yard (Polish: furtka). The furtka usually has an intercom that the guest must ring before being let into the property.

== Two-family houses ==
These houses often have a second and third story. These can contain the expected bedrooms and bathrooms, but many also have a kitchen on each floor. The reason is that a number of these houses were designed by their owners as "two-family houses" (or "three-family houses"). This was a practical move, often in preparation to provide separate space for sons or daughters (who married and had children of their own) while they were saving money for their own house. However, said sons and daughters would sometimes also choose to live there permanently, partly for financial reasons but also in order to be close with their families. In Poland it is not unusual for several generations to live under one roof, especially for large families.

== 1980s and 1990s ==
In the late 1970s and 1980s, there was a property boom fuelled by loans from the USA.

The lower ground floor layout has remained in most houses, providing garage space, storage areas, games rooms, saunas and more. As before, these often have their own front door, so they can easily be converted into offices.

The result is that most modern Polish houses are excellent, both for living in and for running a business. The raised ground floor now houses the kitchen (usually the only one) and a reception room, with doors leading out onto a terrace and down to the garden, also a bathroom and perhaps a bedroom or office. Upstairs are the expected bedrooms and bathroom(s).

The style now is grandeur. Not square houses, but ones with contours and definition; large entrance halls, sweeping reception rooms, heavily decorated bathrooms with corner hydromassage tubs and more. Some properties have become disproportionate to the land they are on, leaving the owner with a large house surrounded by a very small garden.

== Recreational houses ==
Polish recreational houses are houses which have been built for use in the summer or at weekends. They are not usually insulated to the same extent as residential houses and some do not have double glazing. This type of house is a growing trend. Increased wealth has allowed some Poles to buy a second plot of land, perhaps near a lake, forest or the sea, that they can use during the hot summers. Some are brick built but the majority have been constructed from wood. They have a kitchenette, reception room and (usually in the attic) a couple of bedrooms. The majority have bathrooms or at least a toilet and shower but this is not always the case. With such hot summers many have an outside toilet and shower. With temperatures reaching over 40 degrees Celsius these are a popular option, not a downside. These properties can either be found scattered across the countryside or in complexes of all sizes ranging from four or five to hundred houses. The more isolated tend to be more peaceful while the ones in complexes usually have better amenities nearby, like bars, restaurants and shops. In addition, many of the pre-war houses, originally intended for year-round residence, are now sold as recreational houses; many of these only have two bedrooms.
