= Euphrosyne of Polotsk =

Belarusian saint and abbess

Saint Euphrosyne of Polotsk
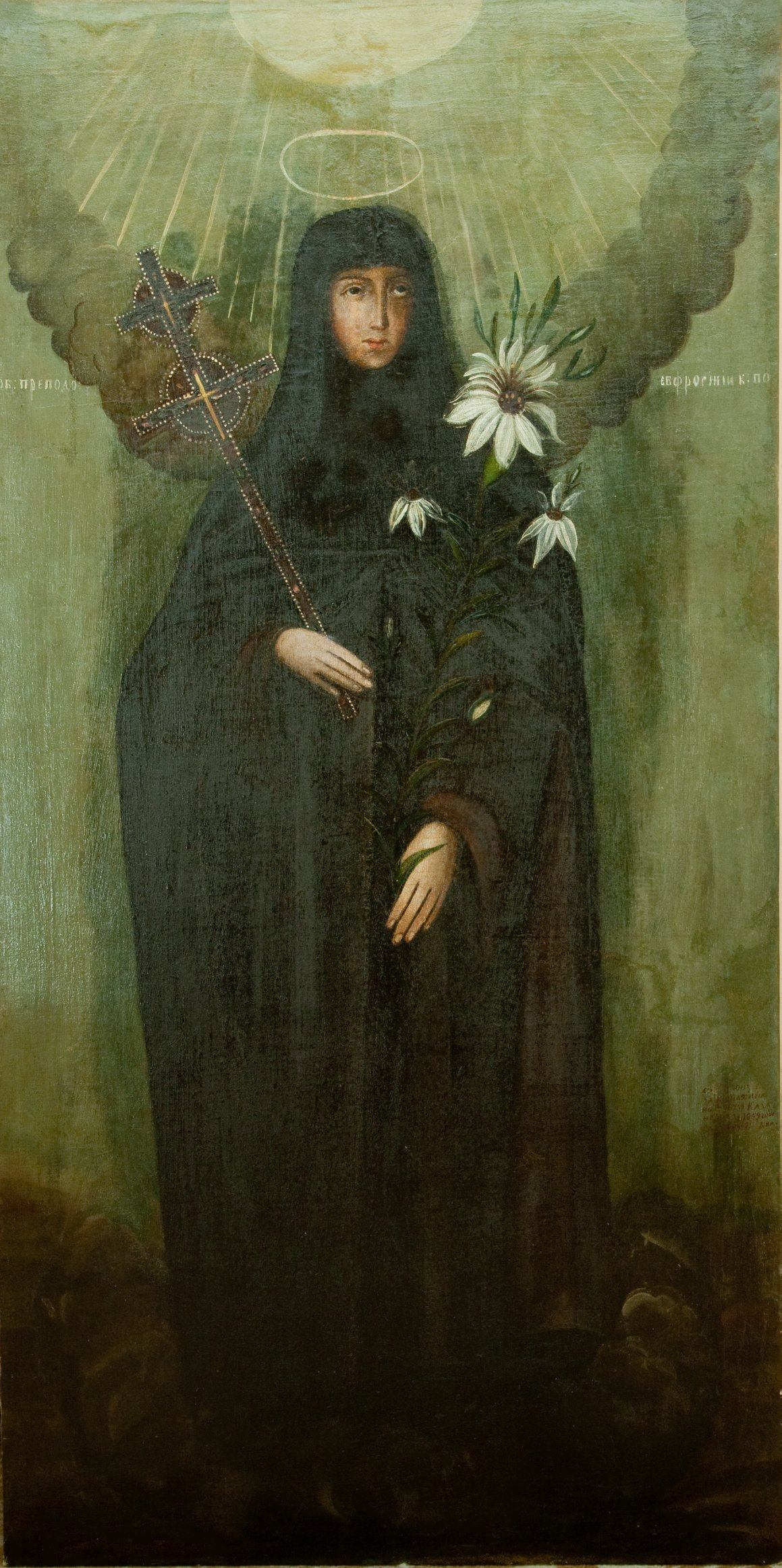
- Fantasy portrait, Grodno State Museum of the History of Religion, 1859

Virgin
- Born: 1104; Polotsk, Principality of Polotsk
- Died: 1167; Mar Saba near Jerusalem, Kingdom of Jerusalem
- Venerated in: Eastern Orthodox Church; Roman Catholic Church
- Feast: 23 May
- Patronage: Belarus
- Website: Page on Belarusian Heroes

Euphrosyne of Polotsk (Belarusian: Еўфрасіння Полацкая; 1104–1167) was the granddaughter of Vseslav, the prince of Polotsk, and daughter of Prince Prince Svyatoslav (Georgy) Vseslavich of Vitebsk. She has long been a popular saint among Orthodox devotees, particularly those in Belarus, Ukraine, and Russia with a traditional feast day of May 23. In addition, since 1984, she has been one of the 15 patron saints of Belarus, whose lives are celebrated in the Belarusian Orthodox Church, on the first Sunday after Pentecost.

== Life ==
Predslava was born between 1101 and 1104, into the Rurik noble family, members of which were the dukes of the principality of Polotsk, in what is modern day Belarus. Her father was Prince Svyatoslav (Georgy) Vseslavich, second son of Vseslav the Sorcerer. It is suggested that Georgy was the Christian name of Svytoslav, although it could have been the hame of his elder brother; historical sources are scarce and unsure.

She refused all proposals of marriage and, without her parents' knowledge, ran away to the convent where her aunt was the abbess. She became a nun and took the name Euphrosyne. With the blessing of the Bishop of Polotsk, she began to live near the Sophia cathedral, where she spent her time copying books. The money she thus earned she distributed amongst the poor.

Around 1128 Bishop Elias of Polotsk entrusted Euphrosyne the task of setting up a convent. At the newly constructed Savior-Transfiguration convent at Seltse she taught young women to copy books, sing, sew and do other handicrafts. Through her efforts, in 1161, a cathedral was built which survives to the present day. She also founded a monastery dedicated to the Mother of God, as well as two churches. The church of The Holy Saviour still stands today and is considered to be the most precious monument of early Belarusian architecture.

Towards the end of her life, she undertook a pilgrimage to Constantinople and the Holy Land. Patriarch Michael II of Constantinople gave her an icon of the Theotokos, which is now called the Virgin of Korsun. The Crusader king, Amalric I of Jerusalem, also received her in the Holy Land where she died circa 1173. Her body, after the conquest of Jerusalem by Saladin in 1187, was carried by the monks to Kiev and deposited there in the Monastery of the Caves. It was only in 1910 that the relics of Euphrosyne were brought back to her native town of Polotsk.

== Veneration ==
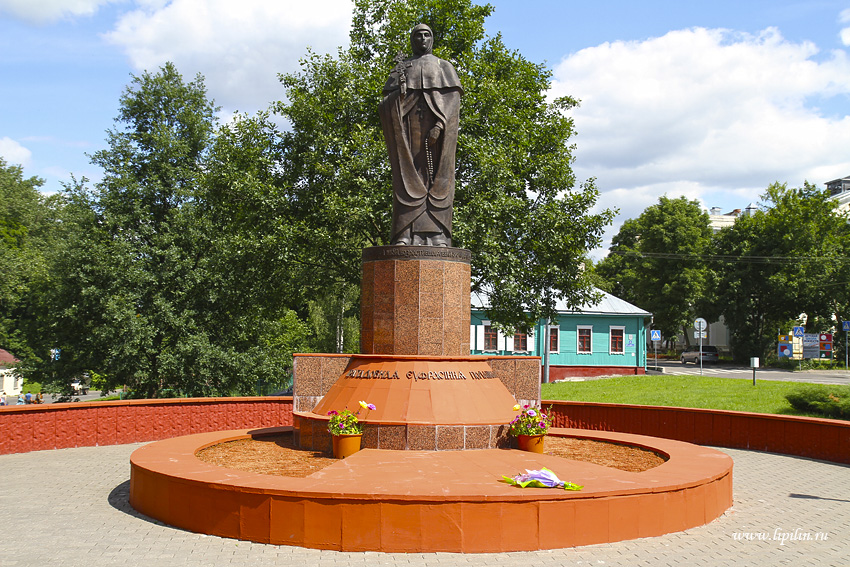
Monument to Euphrosyne of Polotsk in Polotsk

Her feast day is celebrated on May 23. Euphrosyne is the only virgin saint of East Slav origin.

Euphrosyne (or Efrosinia) of Polotsk is a patron saint of Belarus. In Belarus there is a Convent of Saint Euphrosyne in Polotsk and a Saint Euphrosyne Orthodox Church in Minsk. In addition, there are churches dedicated to Euphrosyne of Polotsk in London, Toronto, Vilnius and South River, New Jersey (see: St. Euphrosynia Belarusian Orthodox Church).

== Cross of Saint Euphrosyne ==
The Cross of Saint Euphrosyne was a gem-studded cross created at her behest by a local master, Lazar Bohsha (Belarusian: Лазар Богша). The famous six-armed golden cross was decorated with enamels and precious stones and presented by her to the Church of the Holy Saviour in 1161. The relic survived centuries of turbulence until World War II, when it disappeared during the evacuation of the museum in 1941. The cross was last seen in Mogilev. Despite efforts of the Belarusian government to trace its whereabouts in the early 1990s, which included searching in private collections in the United States, it has not been found.

== See also ==
- List of Catholic saints
- Boris stones
- Saint Eufrosyne Monastery

== Sources ==
- Nadson, Alexander (1969). "The Life of Saint Euphrosyne of Połack". The Journal of Byelorussian Studies. II (1): 3–24.
