= Architecture in Belarus =

Architecture in Belarus

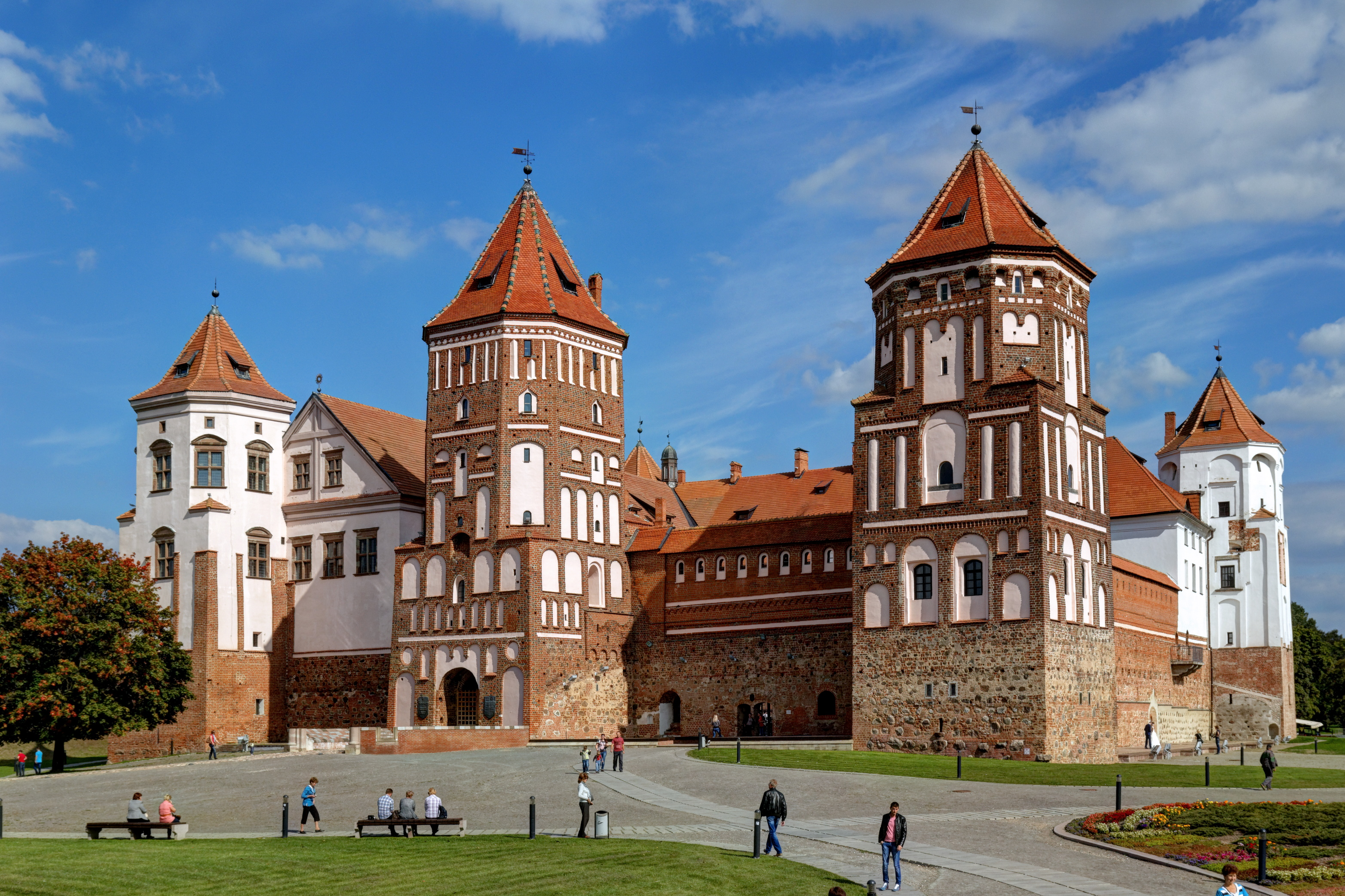
Mir Castle in Mir, Belarus, a UNESCO World Heritage Site

The architecture in Belarus spans a variety of historical periods and styles and reflects the complex history, geography, religion and identity of the country. Several buildings in Belarus have been designated as UNESCO World Heritage Sites in recognition of their cultural heritage, and others have been placed on the tentative list.

== Kievan Rus' ==
The lands that are now Belarus were part of the Kievan Rus' civilization, which is considered to be the progenitor of modern Ukraine, Belarus, and Russia. The Principality of Polotsk, and especially its capital at Polotsk, was an early cultural center of Belarus. The Saint Sophia Cathedral in Polotsk is one example of Rus' architecture that survives in Belarus, although it has been heavily modified, and the Saint Eufrosyne Monastery in Polotsk also dates from this period. Kalozha Church in Grodno and Annunciation Church in Vitebsk can also be dated to this time.

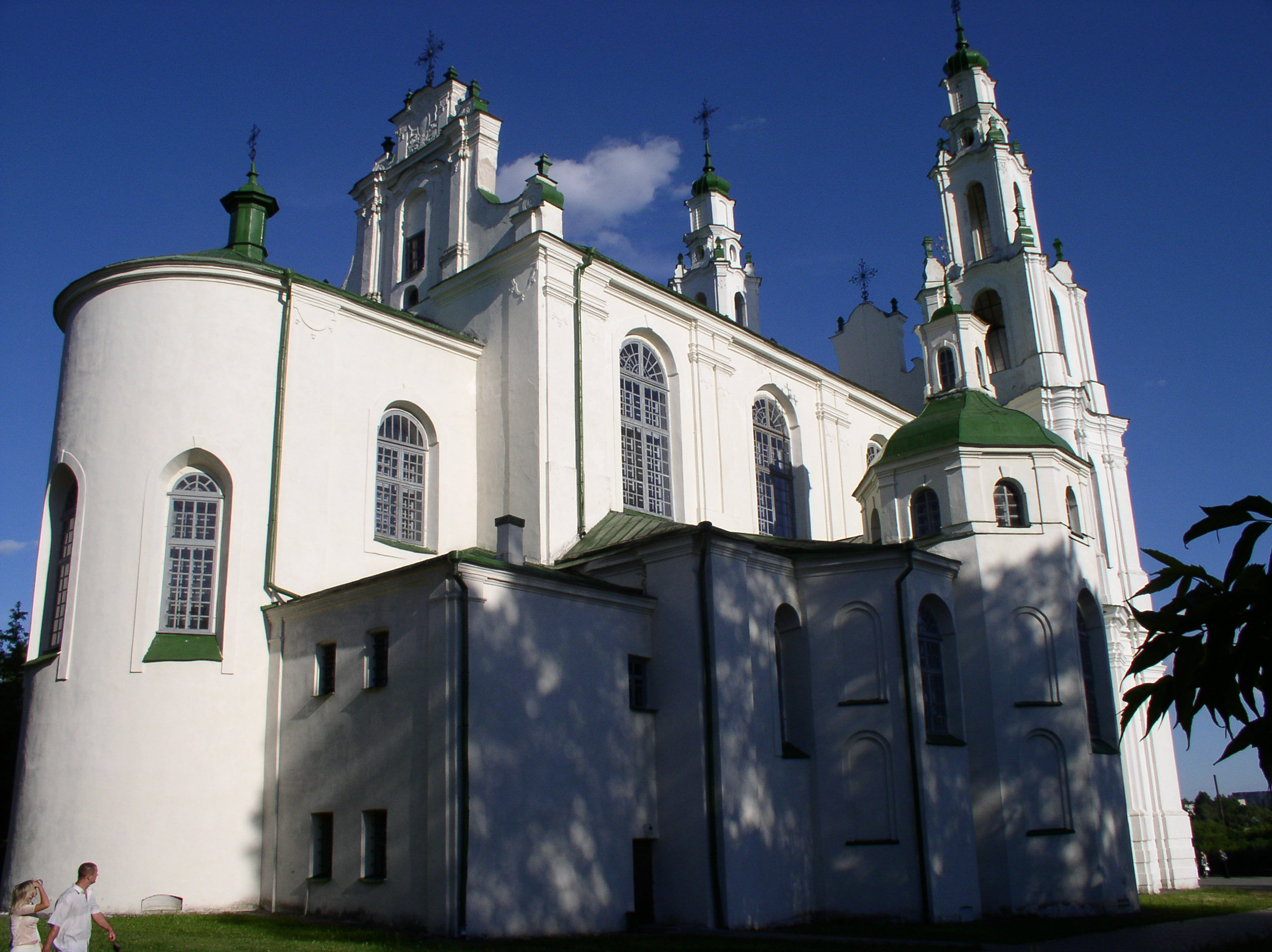
Saint Sophia Cathedral in Polotsk was originally built in the 12th century, although it later underwent extensive alteration in the Baroque style.

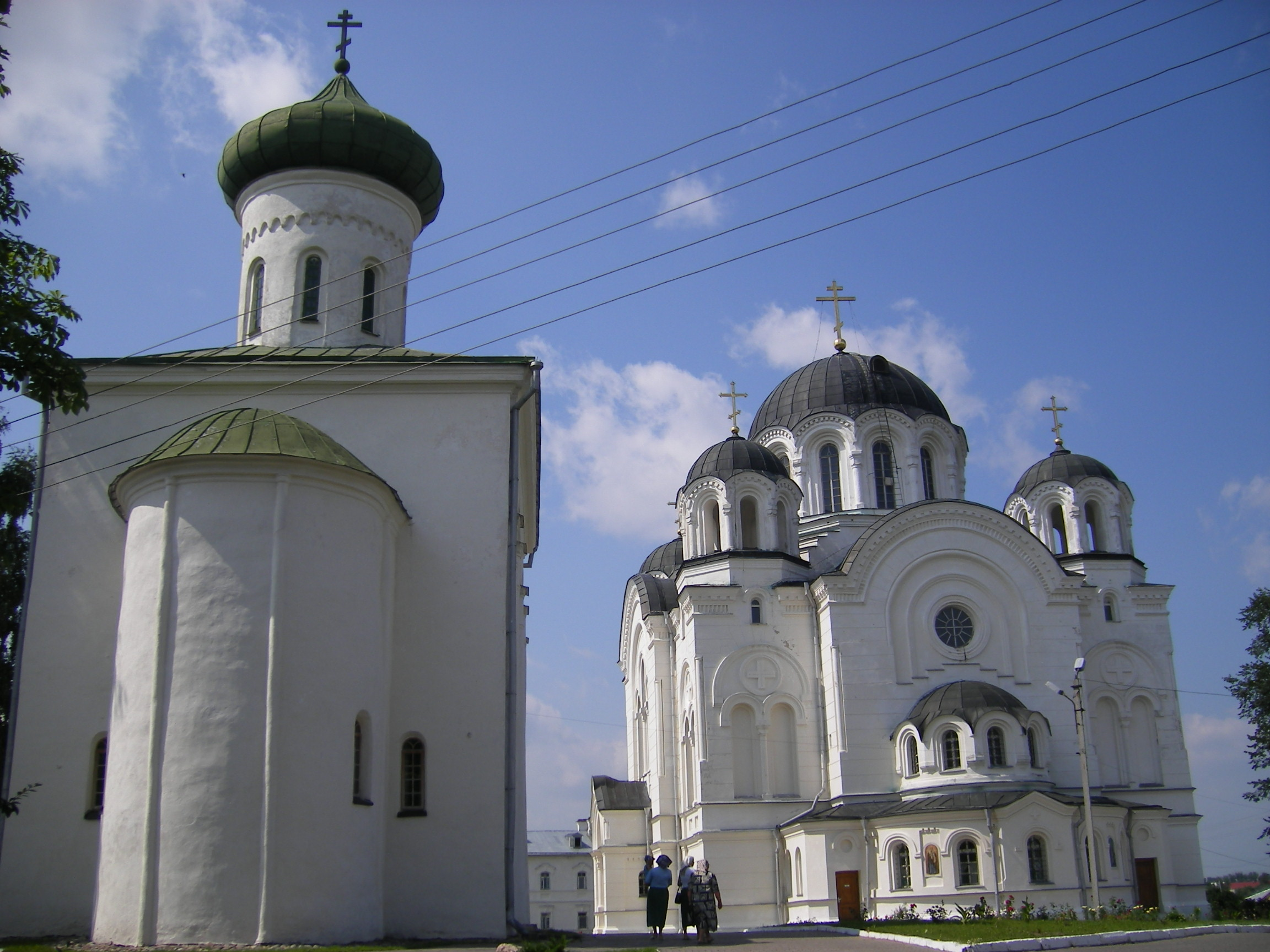
Saint Eufrosyne Monastery in Polotsk

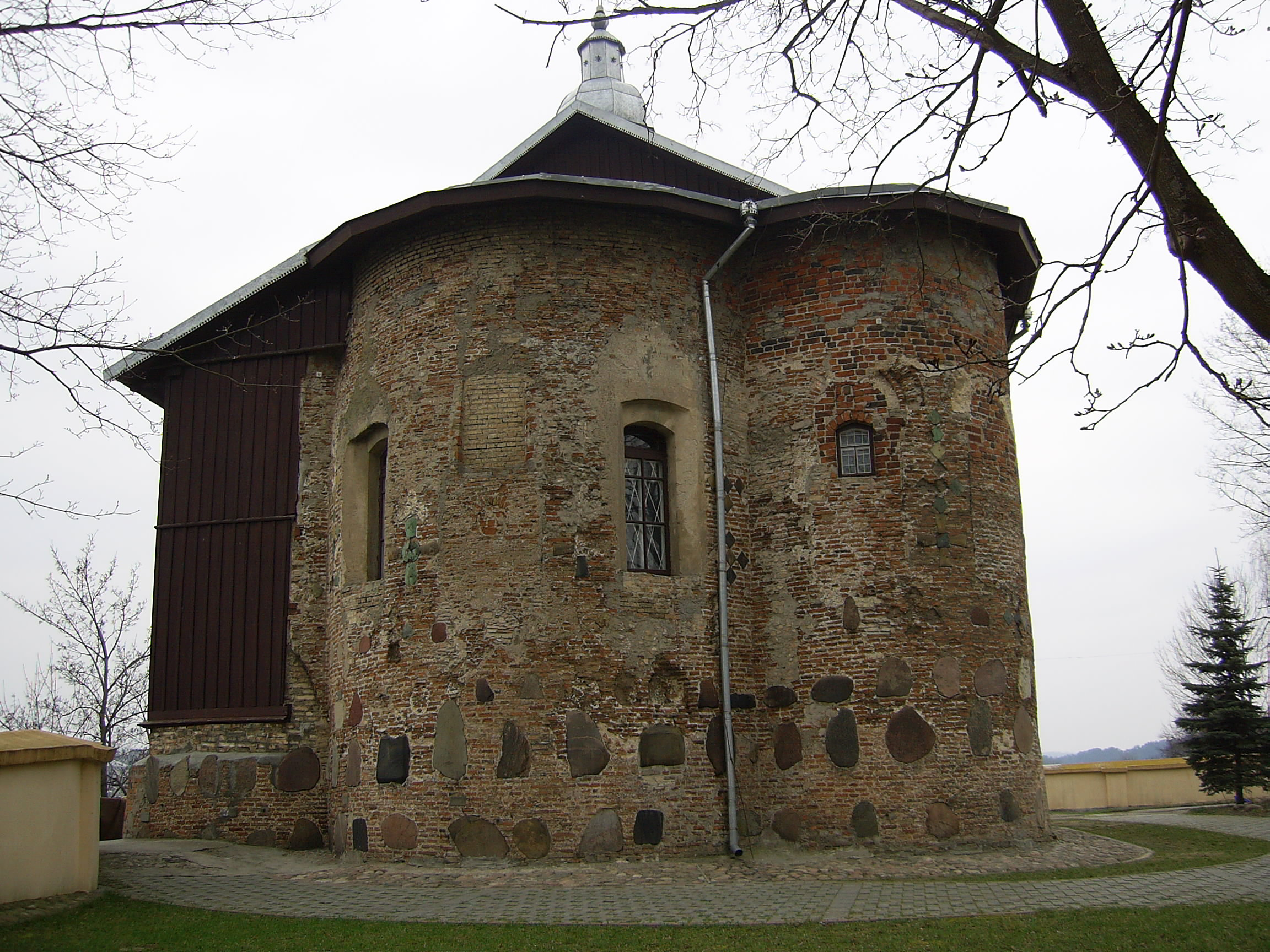
Kalozha Church in Grodno dates from the 12th century.

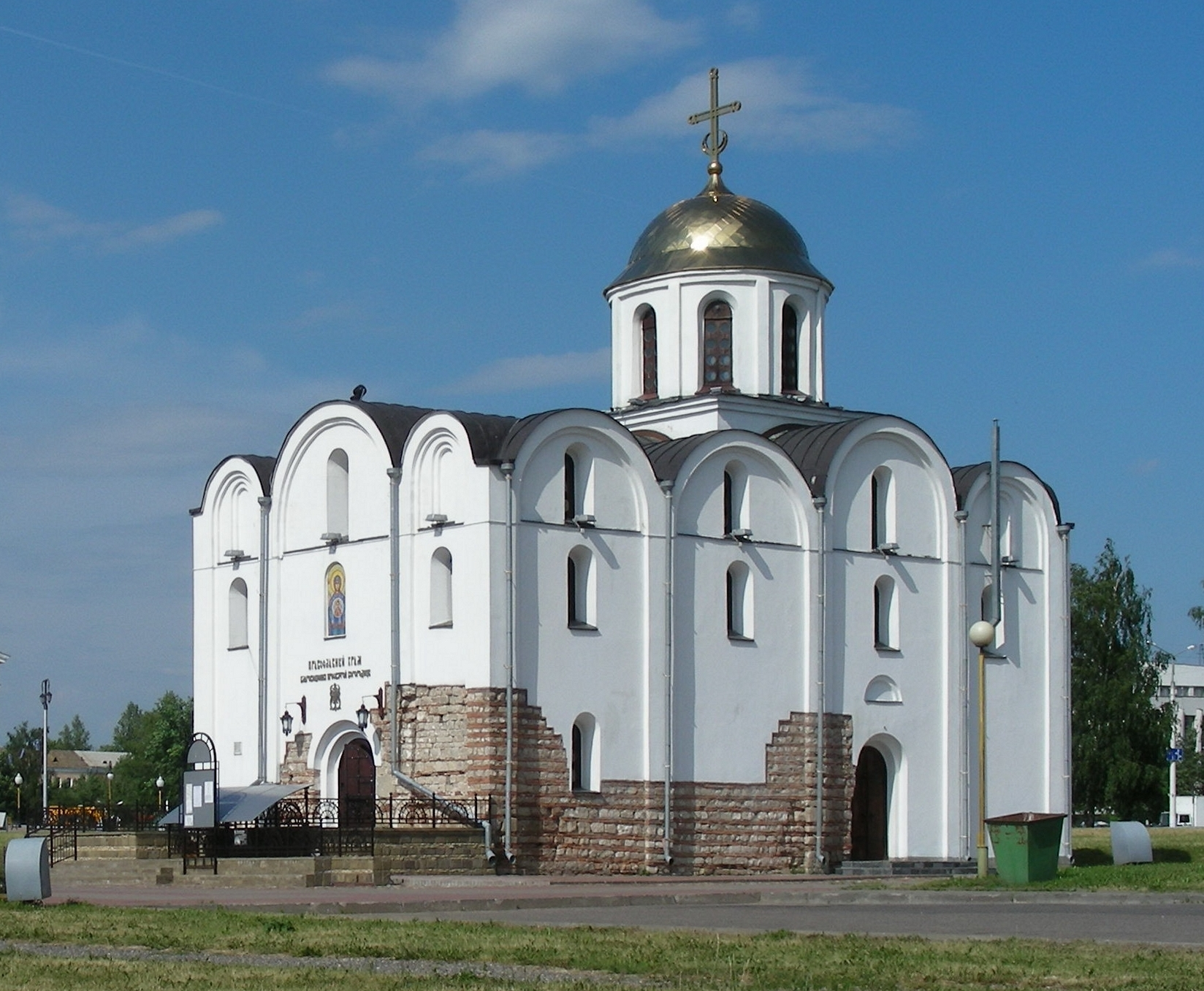
Annunciation Church in Vitebsk

== Polish-Lithuanian Commonwealth ==
In 1307 the Principality of Polotsk was formally absorbed into the Grand Duchy of Lithuania. In 1386 the Crown of the Kingdom of Poland and the Grand Duchy of Lithuania entered into a de facto personal union, and the 1569 Union of Lublin consolidated the lands of the Grand Duchy of Lithuania and the Kingdom of Poland into a single state, the Polish-Lithuanian Commonwealth. The Commonwealth period saw the rise of the distinct Belarusian Gothic architectural style across the lands of what are now Belarus, Poland and Lithuania. Some of these buildings consist of fortified churches, and historian Andrew Wilson observed that a unique "Gothic-Orthodox" architectural style emerged in Belarus at this time. Although many of these structures are Orthodox churches, after the Union of Brest in 1596 many Belarusians embraced the Uniate faith. The Church of St. Michael, Synkavichy and the Church of the Nativity of the Blessed Virgin Mary, Muravanka are two fine examples of this architectural style.

Several fine castles that remain standing to this day were built in Belarus in this period. Mir Castle and Nesvizh Castle are two of the most notable surviving examples and were both owned by the wealthy and powerful Radziwiłł family of Polish-Lithuanian nobles. Other prominent castles from this period like Halshany Castle remain in a ruined state today. The Tower of Kamyenyets is another important defensive landmark. Baroque architecture also began to emerge in Belarus at this time, particularly in the city of Grodno in the west, influenced by the Vilnian Baroque style that was developing in Vilnius. The Slonim Synagogue was also built in the Baroque style during this period.

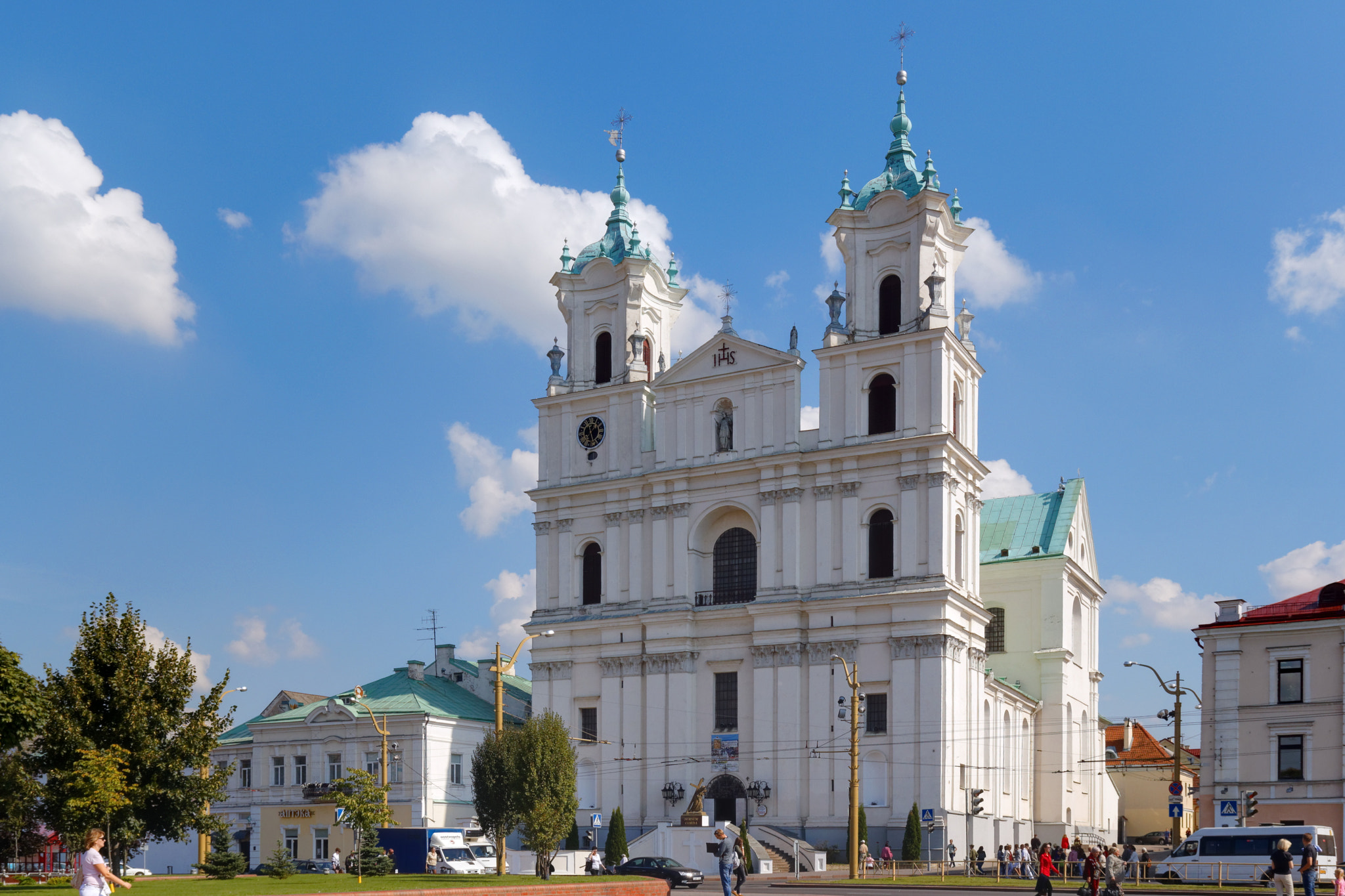
St. Francis Xavier Cathedral, Grodno, a Roman Catholic cathedral built in the late 17th century in ornate Baroque style.

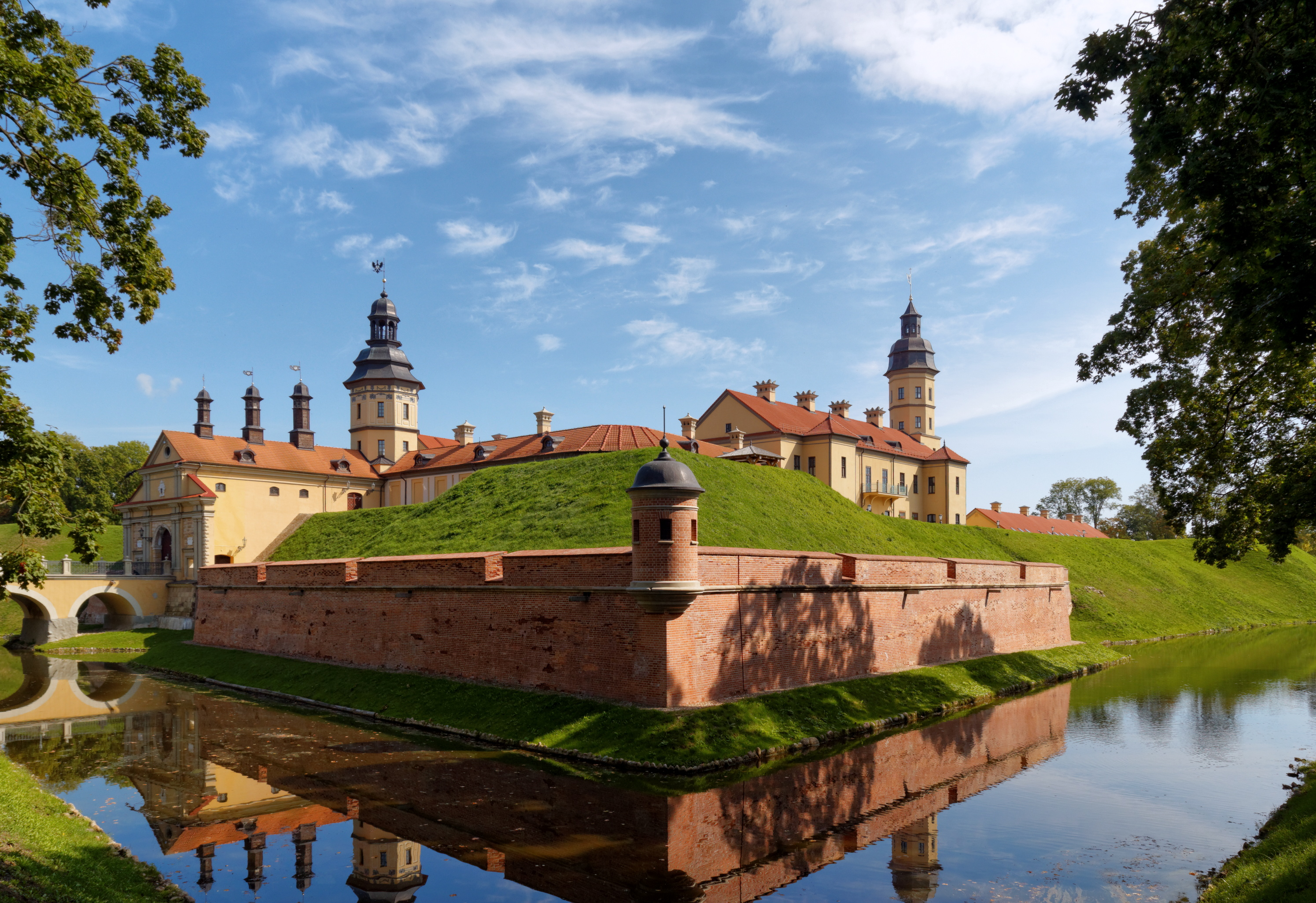
Nesvizh Castle, dating from the Polish-Lithuanian Commonwealth.

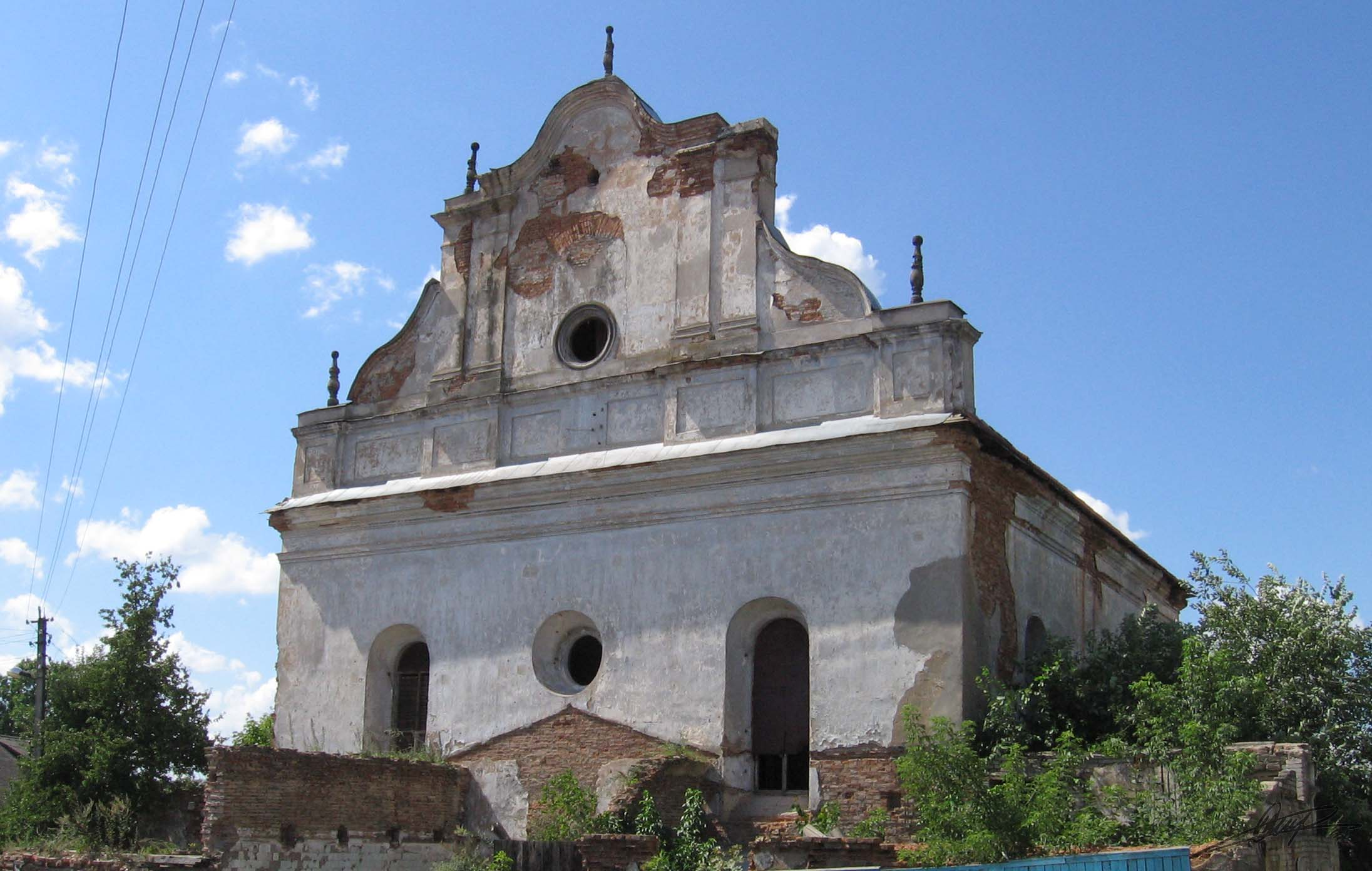
The baroque Slonim Synagogue, built in 1642, remains in a dilapidated state.

== Russian Empire ==
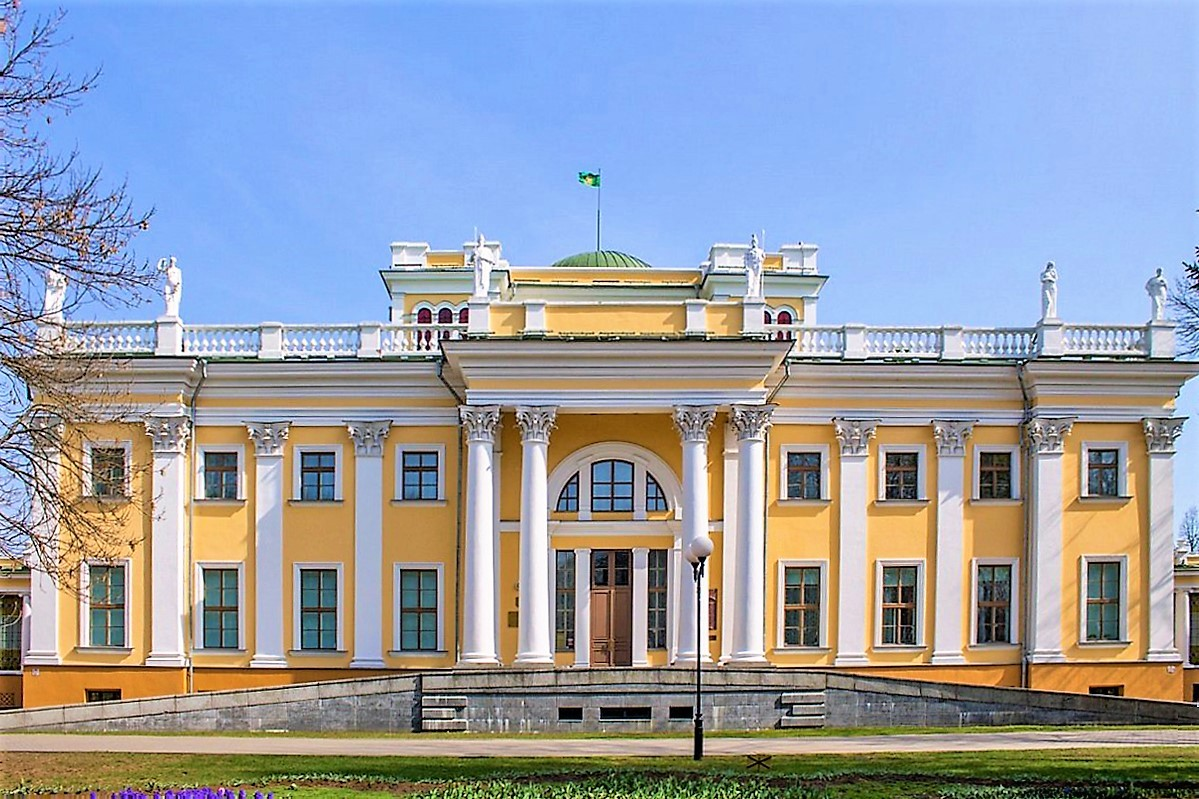
Gomel Palace, built in the time of Catherine the Great for Pyotr Rumyantsev.

As the Polish-Lithuanian Commonwealth went into decline in the 17th and 18th centuries, the Partitions of Poland saw almost the entire territory of modern Belarus absorbed into the burgeoning Russian Empire. Several distinguished works of architecture in Belarus date from this time. Gomel Palace, originally built for the distinguished general and nobleman Pyotr Rumyantsev in the time of Catherine the Great, is a lavish example. The building has been noted for its grandeur and its synthesis of influences of Romanticism and Palladian Architecture. Priluki Palace in Minsk Region, completed in the mid-19th century, still stands and reflects the influence of the neo-Gothic architectural style in the Russian Empire. After the Uniate Church was suppressed by the Russian Empire and went into decline, churches in Belarus were built in the Russian Revival and Neo-Byzantine styles in the 19th century. Most of the population remained rural, and wooden churches often served as places of worship for peasant communities. Several of these wooden churches, including St. Nicetas in Zdzitava, have been inscribed on the UNESCO World Heritage tentative list.

This period also saw the construction of many synagogues in Belarus, reflecting the large Jewish community in the region. By the 20th century, a distinctive style of wooden synagogue architecture had come to characterise the borderlands between Poland, Lithuania and Belarus. Moorish and neo-Gothic forms became common flourishes in synagogue architecture in what is now Belarus.

== Soviet architecture ==
In 1917 the Russian Empire collapsed amidst the Russian Revolution and the Bolsheviks came to power. In 1922 the Byelorussian Soviet Socialist Republic became one of the constituent republics of the Union of Soviet Socialist Republics. Belarus was devastated by the Second World War, leading to many buildings being rebuilt. In the aftermath of the war the borders of Eastern Europe were redrawn by Stalin, and the Byelorussian Republic gained many territories that had been part of Poland. Minsk in particular has many buildings and monuments dating back to the Stalinist period. 80 percent of the city was destroyed in the war and it was subsequently rebuilt as the "quintessential Soviet city, with wide boulevards and identikit Brutalist architecture". Barykina has termed this architectural style 'Stalinist Empire' and notes that it favors "squares, monuments, grand boulevards, and massive state buildings" as can be observed in Minsk. Most of what was left of the old city was torn down and was replaced by the "perfect 'socialist city'" in line with the prevailing style of Socialist Realism. Commentators have remarked upon the completeness of the Stalinist nature of Minsk's centre; according to Barykina the destruction of most of the city created a "historical urban tabula rasa" for Soviet urban designers. Nevertheless, some prominent landmarks from the 1930s in Minsk including Government House (1930-1934), the National Opera and Ballet of Belarus (1934-1938), and the Building of the Academy of Sciences (1932–1939) survived the war. Further from the centre, blocks of wooden houses built to address an acute housing shortage after World War II can be seen. The historically Jewish Nemiga district (Nyamiha in Belarusian), including Minsk's oldest synagogue and the likely site of an early medieval fortress, survived the war largely intact, but was demolished in the 1960s-1980s.

Minsk's main street, Independence Avenue, is marked by numerous imposing examples of Stalinist Architecture. Minsk was awarded Hero City status in the wake of World War II and a lavish, 38-meter obelisk marking the victory was constructed on Victory Square at the intersection of Independence Avenue and Zakharau Street between 1950-1956. Huge works of monumental architecture, like the "Courage" monument in the Brest Fortress, were also built in other parts of Belarus during the Soviet period.

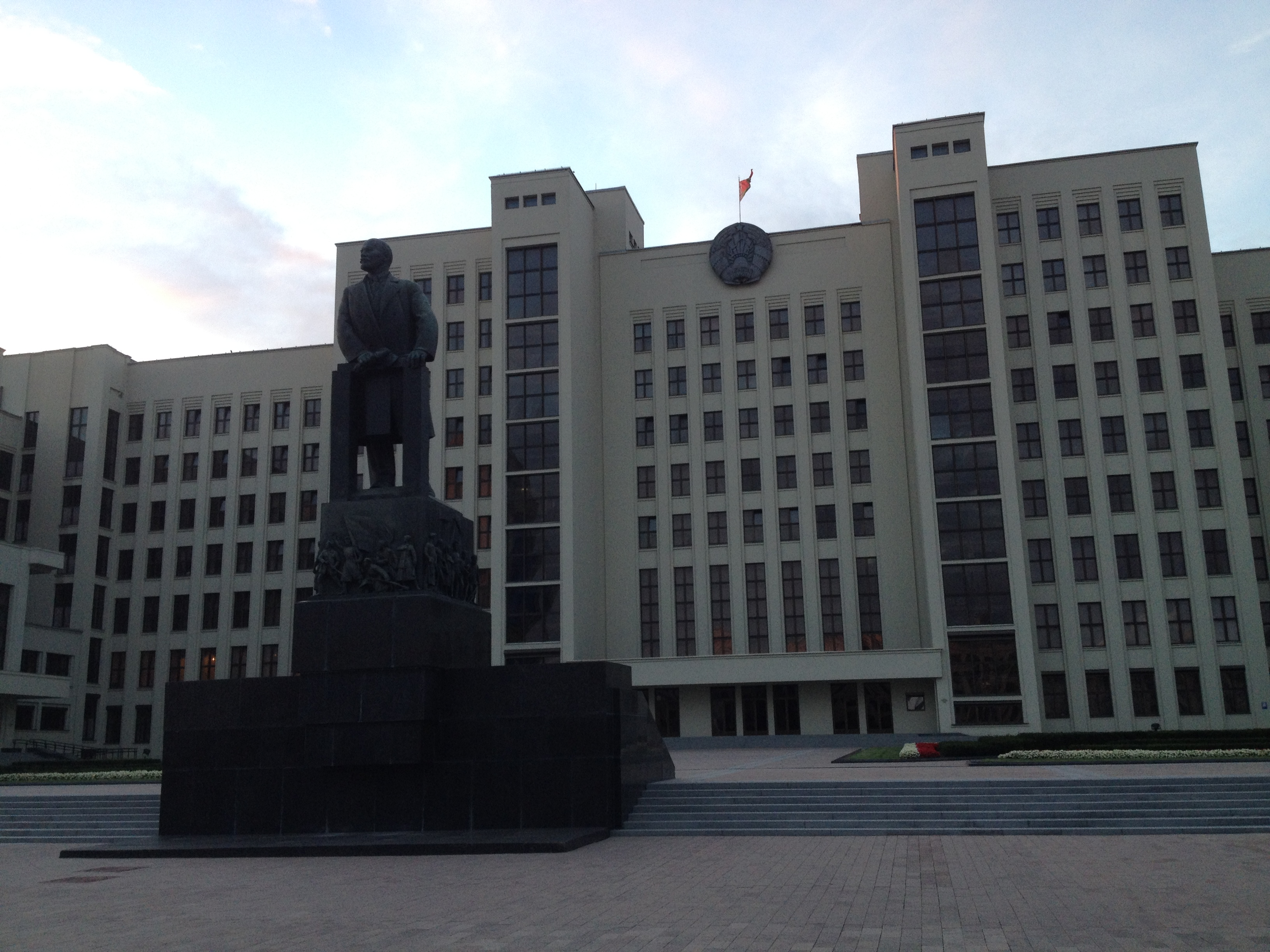
Government House in central Minsk fronted by a statue of Lenin.

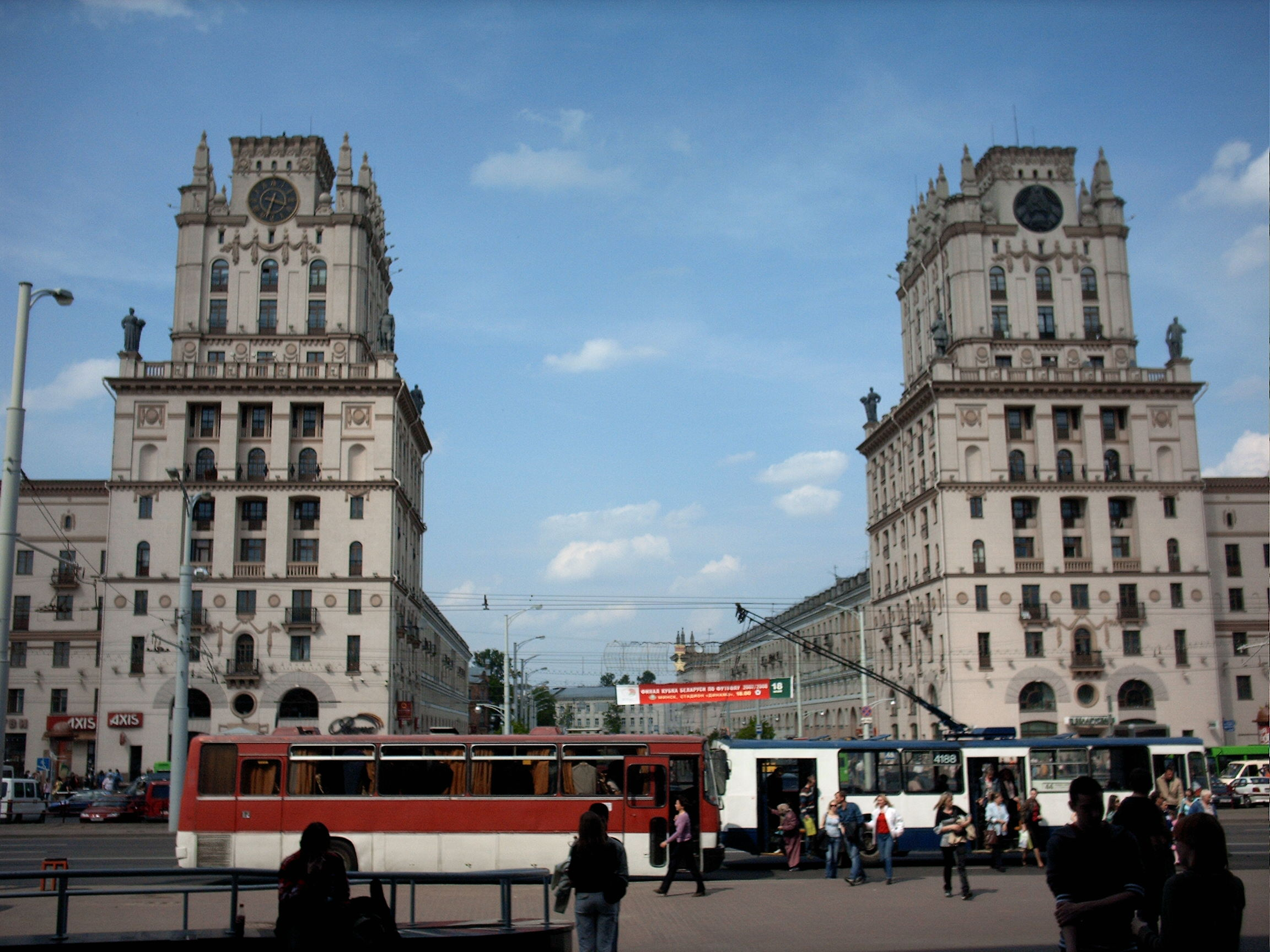
Stalinist Architecture in central Minsk.

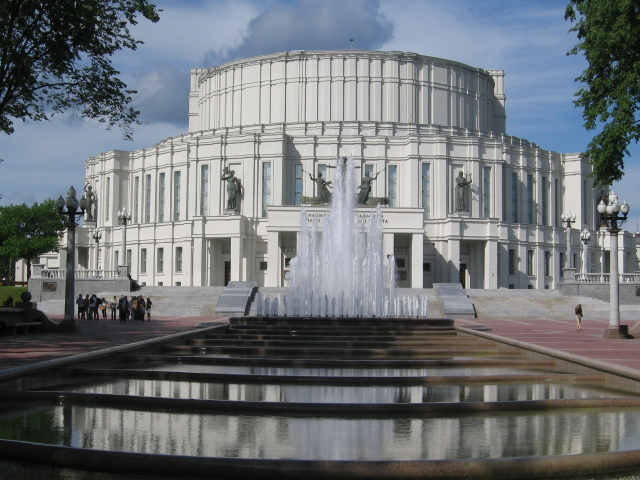
The National Opera and Ballet of Belarus building dates from the 1930s.

== Modern Belarus ==
The National Library of Belarus, completed in 2006.

Belarus gained its independence after the Soviet Union disintegrated in 1991. Several landmarks of architecture have been built since this time. The prominent Palace of the Republic in Minsk was conceived during the 1980s, but not completed until 2001, and it retains the Stalinist architectural style of past generations. The distinctive and enormous National Library of Belarus is a prominent architectural landmark in Minsk, displaying an unusual rhombicuboctahedron shape. The building is 73.6 metres in height with 23 floors, can seat about 2,000 readers, and features a 500-seat conference hall. The library's new building was designed by architects Mihail Vinogradov and Viktor Kramarenko and opened in June 2006.

The Church of St Cyril of Turau and All the Patron Saints of the Belarusian People in Woodside Park in London is a modern reimagining of Belarusian church architecture belonging to the minority Belarusian Greek Catholic Church, and was completed in 2016. The building, designed by architect Tszwai So, won acclaim for its architectural qualities, and garnered multiple design awards.

== See also ==
- Belarusian Gothic
- Architecture in Kievan Rus'
- Russian architecture
- Ukrainian architecture
