= Lazar Bohsha =

Goldsmith from Polotsk (fl. 12th century)

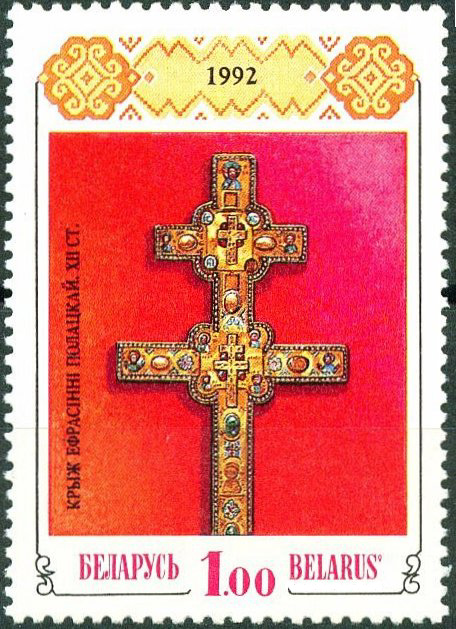
Stamp with the Cross of St. Euphrosyne by Lazar Bohsha (1992)

Lazar Bohsha (Belarusian: Лазар Богша; fl. 12th century) was a goldsmith whom Euphrosyne of Polotsk (a princess of the Principality of Polotsk) commissioned to make a precious communion cross for the Cathedral of the Transfiguration of the Saviour in 1161. The cross became a revered Belarusian relic known as the Cross of Saint Euphrosyne. Lazar engraved his name on the backside of the cross, thus making it known to the descendants.

It is extremely rare for an artwork of this era to bear any indication of the exact date of its creation as well as the artist's name. A number of anonymous art pieces of the same period made in a similar artistic technique are attributed to Lazar Bohsha and are considered to be the best examples of enamel art of Ancient Rus. Preserved art pieces of the same technique but of a later period are attributed to Lazar's students.

By origin, Lazar was a descendant from the Western Slavs (specifically, South-Western Rus'). Lazar is his christening name, while Bohsha is an abbreviation of his pagan name Boguslav, which was a popular name among Western Slavs in the 12th century. There is no information about where he learned the enameling art. It is believed to be either Byzantine or Georgia (which was the first country to adopt this art form from Byzantine). It is assumed that Lazar learned the art when he was young and worked on this technique all his life.

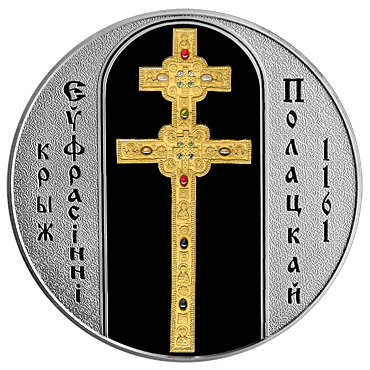
Cross of Saint Euphrosyne (coin on National Bank of the Republic of Belarus, 2007)
