= Vishnyeva, Valozhyn district rural council =

Vishnyeva rural council (Belarusian: Вішнеўскі сельсавет; Russian: Вишневский сельсовет) is a lower-level subdivision (selsoviet) of Valozhyn district, Minsk region, Belarus. Its administrative center is Vishnyeva.
