= Cross of Saint Euphrosyne =

Belarusian cross, symbol of Belarus and Orthodox Christianity

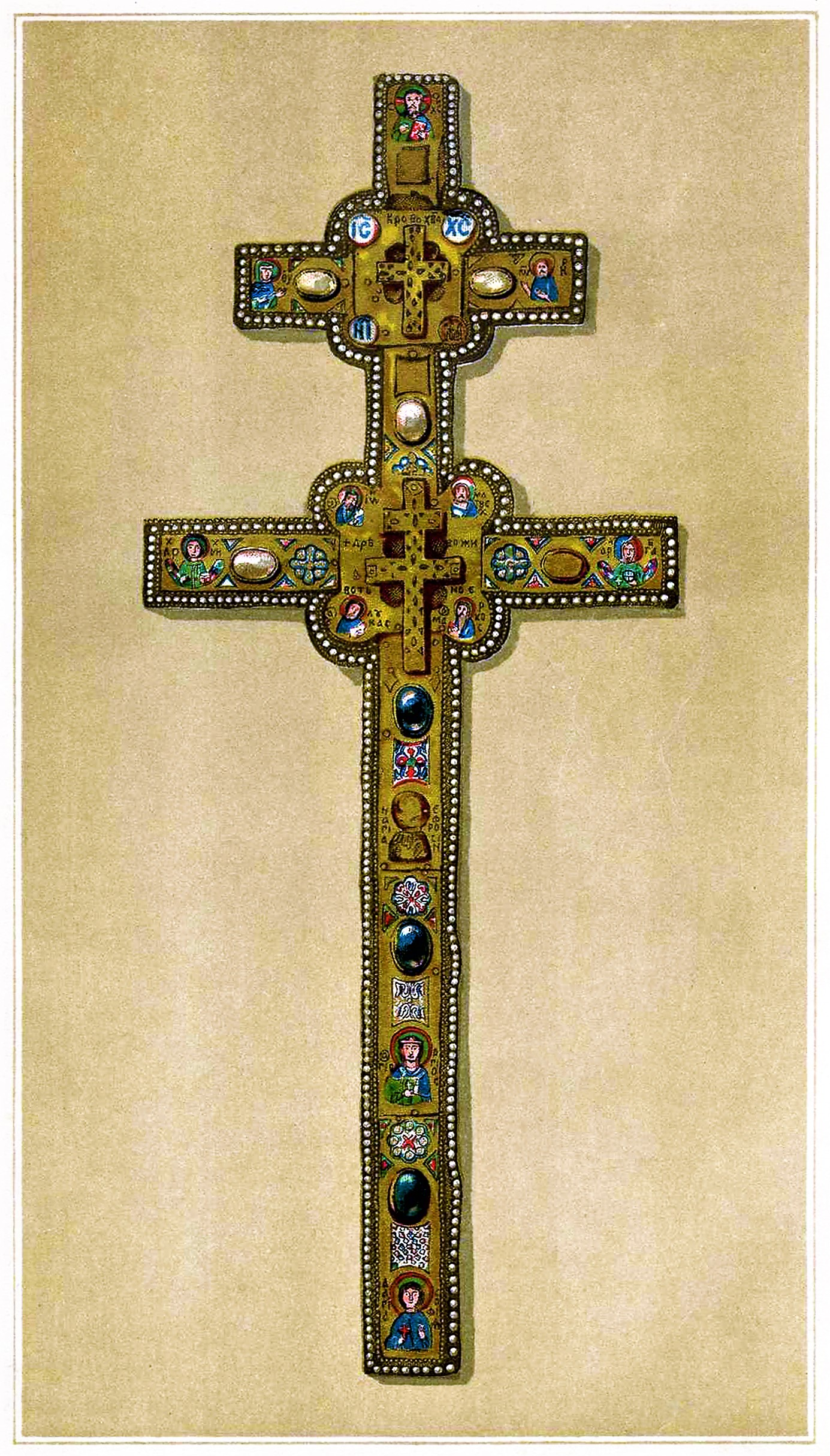
1889 reproduction of the cross

The Cross of Saint Euphrosyne or Cross of Euphrosyne of Polotsk (Belarusian: Крыж Ефрасінні Полацкай) was a revered relic of the Orthodox Church in Belarus, which was made in 1161 by Lazar Bohsha on the order of Euphrosyne of Polotsk and is regarded as a national treasure of Belarus.

Euphrosyne, mother superior of Polotsk Convent, ordered the cross to decorate the new Transfiguration church. The simple cypress cross was decorated with gold, gemstones and enamel, depicting Jesus Christ, John the Baptist, the Theotokos (Mother of God), the Four Evangelists, the archangels Gabriel and Michael, and three patron saints of Euphrosyne and her parents. The work cost 120 grivnas. Inside, the cross contained pieces of the Holy Cross and other relics.

In the 13th century, the cross was relocated to Smolensk and in 1514 to Moscow. It was returned to Polotsk by Ivan the Terrible in 1563. The cross was thoroughly photographed for the record in 1896. In 1928 the nationalized relic was taken to Minsk, then, in 1929, to Mogilev, and was locked in a safe box of the regional Communist Party headquarters.

== Disappearance ==
The cross disappeared during the swift invasion of Belarus (June-August 1941) by German forces during World War II.

It is not known exactly what happened to the cross in 1941. There are at least three different versions (other than destruction by fire or plunder):

- The official Soviet version abruptly stated that the cross was looted by the Germans.
- German paperwork of the Alfred Rosenberg organization recorded a Mogilev treasure captured by the Germans in Smolensk. However, there is no evidence it was the Polotsk Cross.
- In 1991, the minister of culture of Belarus asserted that the cross, together with other Belarusian treasures, had been evacuated to Moscow.

In 1997, Nikolay Kuzmich, a craftsman from Brest, completed an officially endorsed replica of the cross, now on display in the Polotsk cathedral.

== Modern symbolic usage ==
The Cross of St. Euphrosyne is often used as a national symbol of Belarus. The 1991 version of the Belarusian coat of arms Pahonia and the coat of arms of Vitebsk Region features a cross resembling the Cross of St. Euphrosyne on the knight's shield. The Cross was also used as a common flag pole ornament with the white-red-white flag of Belarus in 1991–1995.

The Cross is the subject of several postage stamps of Belarus, issued in 1992, 2001 and 2011, and a commemorative coin of Belarus issued in 2007.

The national-democratic opposition movement Young Front has the cross as a main element of its symbol.

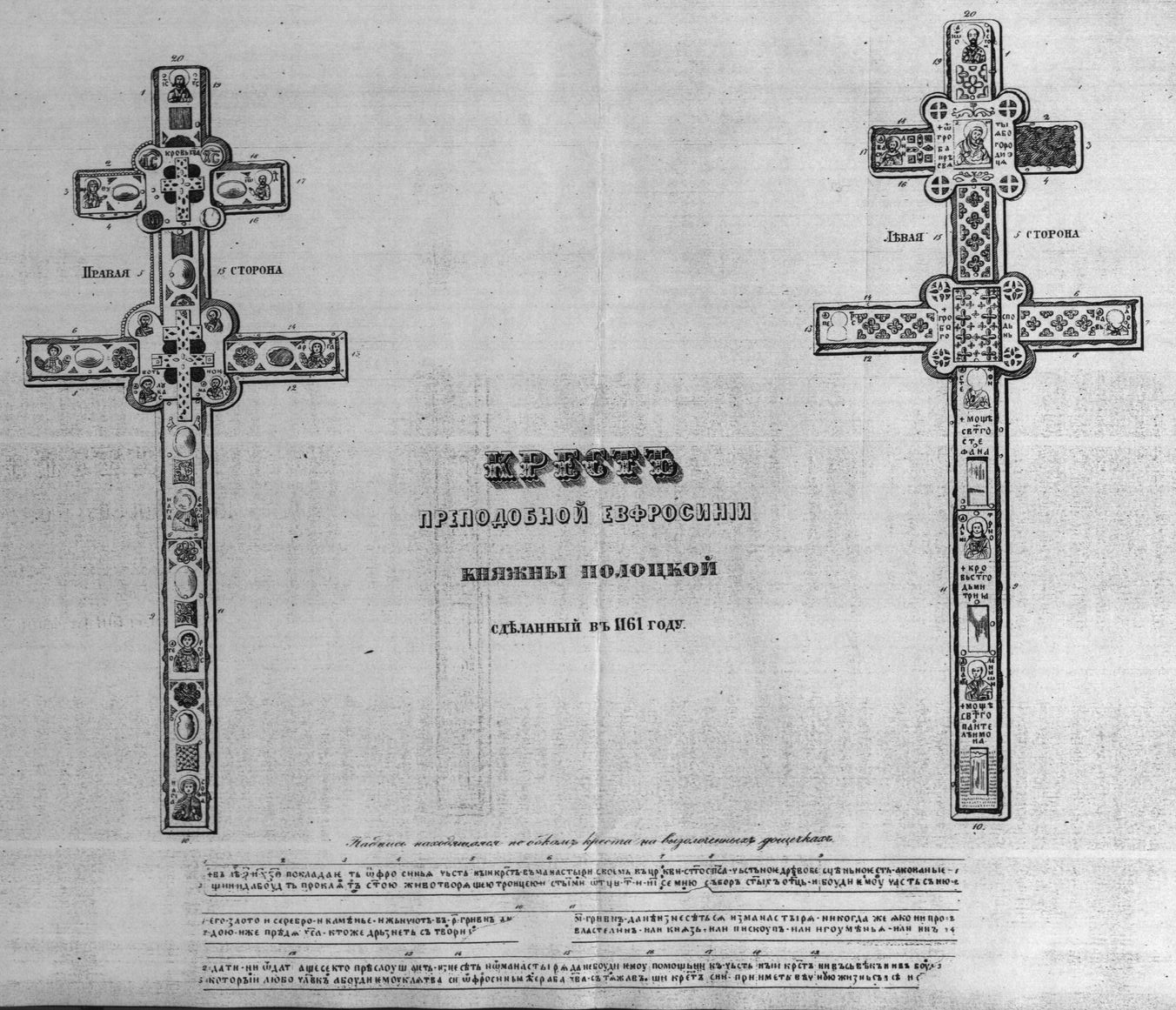
1863 drawing of the cross showing both sides

Pahonia, the coat of arms of Belarus (1991 version)

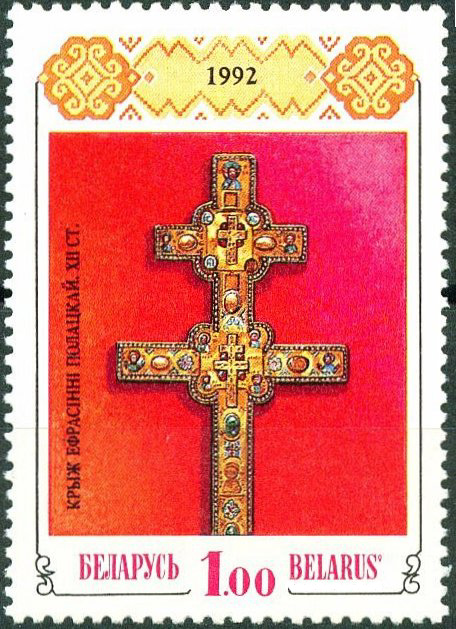
Stamp with the Cross of St. Euphrasyne from 1992

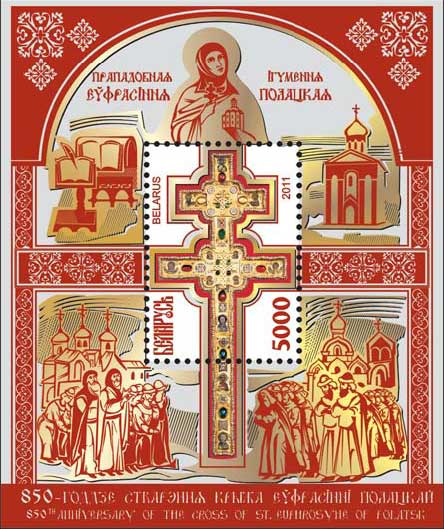
Stamp with the Cross of St. Euphrasyne from 2011

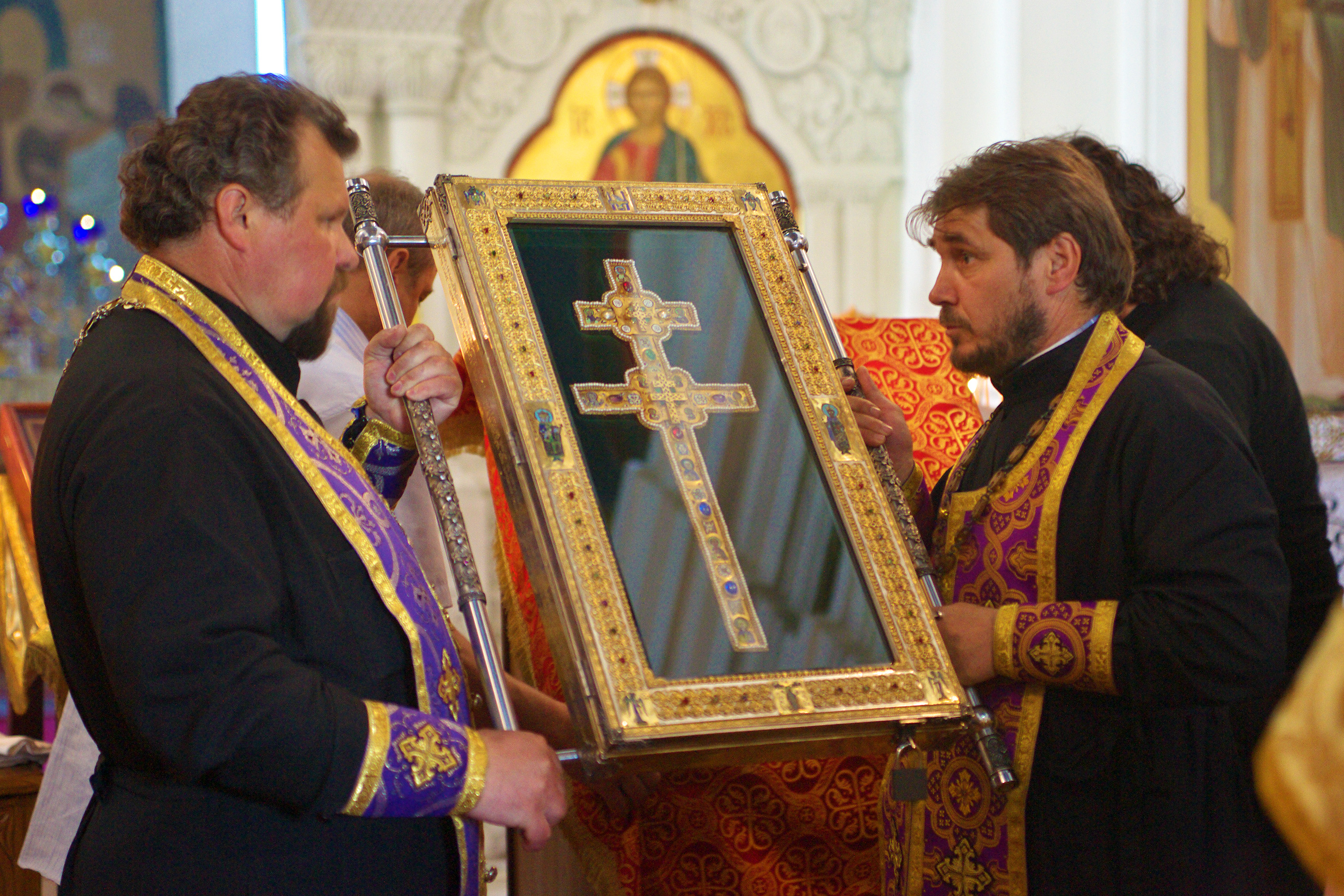
Copy of Cross of Saint Euphrosyne 1997

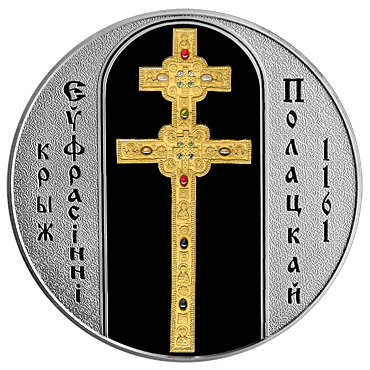
A Belarusian commemorative coin from 2007

Coat of arms of Vitebsk Region

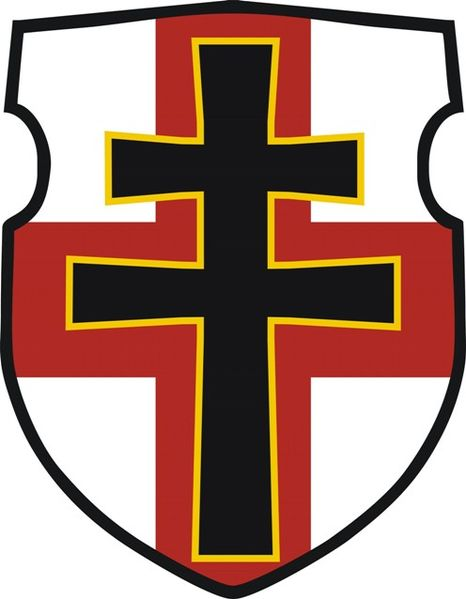
Emblem of the Young Front, a national democratic opposition movement

== See also ==
- Cross of Lorraine, another variant with two horizontal bars
