= List of University of Technology Malaysia alumni =

The following is a list of notable alumni and faculty of University of Technology Malaysia (UTM).

== Government and politics ==
=== Federal Ministers and Deputy Federal Ministers ===
- Datuk Seri Ir. Dr. Wee Ka Siong, Malaysian politician and engineer, government minister, member of the Malaysian Parliament for Ayer Hitam, Melaka (since 2004)
- Tan Sri Datuk Seri Panglima Haji Annuar Haji Musa, Malaysian politician, businessman and town planner, government minister
- Dato' Seri Hamzah Zainudin, Malaysian politician, government minister
- Mohd Shahar Abdullah, Malaysian politician, government minister, member of the Malaysian Parliament
- Dato' Seri Shaziman Abu Mansor, Malaysian politician, government minister, member of the Malaysian Parliament for Tampin (1999–2018)
- Datuk Lim Ban Hong, Malaysian politician, g minister, and Malaysian senator (2020–2021)
- Sim Tze Tzin, Malaysian politician and engineer, member of the Malaysian Parliament for Bayan Baru (since 2013), member of the Penang State Legislative Assembly for Pantai Jerejak (2008–2013)
- Adly Zahari, Deputy Minister of Defence (since 2022), 11th Chief Minister of Malacca, MP of Alor Gajah (since 2022), MLA of Bukit Katil (since 2018).

=== Chief Ministers ===
- Dato' Saarani Mohamad, Malaysian politician, served as Menteri Besar of Perak (since 2020), government minister, member of the Perak State Legislative Assembly for Kota Tampan (since 1999)

=== Elected representatives and politicians ===
- Chan Ming Kai, Malaysian politician, government minister, member of the Perlis State Legislative Assembly for Indera Kayangan (2013–2018), member of the Perak State Legislative Assembly for Simpang Pulai (2008–2013)
- Dato' Haji Zainol Fadzi Paharudin, Malaysian politician, served as adviser to Menteri Besar of Perak (since 2018), member of Perak State Executive Councillor in Public Utilities, Infrastructure, Energy and Water (2013–2018) & Art, Culture, Youth and Sports (2009–2013) and member of the Perak State Legislative Assembly for Sungai Manik (since 2008)
- Suhaizan Kayat, Malaysian politician, served as Speaker of the Johor State Legislative Assembly (2018-2022), member of Malaysian Parliament for Pulai (since 9 September 2023)
- Chan Tzun Hei, Malaysian politician, served as Sabah Deputy Youth Chief of Parti Gerakan Rakyat Malaysia (since 2014)
- Mardani Ali Sera, Indonesian politician and notable lecturer

== Public services and military ==
- Tan Sri Dato' Sri Azam Baki, Malaysian investigation officer, become the Chief Commissioner of Malaysian Anti-Corruption Commission (since 2020)
- Tan Sri Dato' Seri Panglima Acryl Sani Abdullah Sani, Malaysian police officer, become the Malaysian Inspector-General of Police (since 2021)
- Yapp Syau Yin, Malaysian military pilot and flight instructor

== Academia and lecturers ==
- Wahid Omar, Malaysian lecturer and professor, served as vice chancellor of University of Technology Malaysia (2013–2020)
- Chuah Joon Huang, Malaysian professional engineer, professor and university administrator, served as the president and CEO of Southern University College

== Business and economics ==
- Ganesh Kumar Bangah, Malaysian serial entrepreneur, technology industry leader and startup investor, founded MOL Global and Commerce

== Authors, writers and journalists ==
- Dr. Anas Alam Faizli, Malaysian business leader, author and scholar

== Actors, directors, models and singers ==
- Melvin Sia, Malaysian actor, model and singer
- Brandon Wong, Singaporean actor
