= Blue Hotel =

Blue Hotel may refer to:

- "The Blue Hotel", an 1898 short story by Stephen Crane
- Blue Hotel (album) or the title song, by Fox, 1977
- "Blue Hotel", a 1982 song by Lene Lovich from No Man's Land
- "Blue Hotel", a 1987 song by Chris Isaak from Chris Isaak
- The Blue (hotel), a hotel in Taipei

== See also ==
- Radisson Blu, an international hotel chain
