= Wolfson College =

Wolfson College may refer to:

- Wolfson College, Cambridge
- Wolfson College, Oxford
