= Chuah Joon Huang =

Malaysian engineer and university administrator (born 1976)

Prof. Ir. Ts. Dr. Chuah Joon Huang Hon. FAFEO
- 蔡润煌
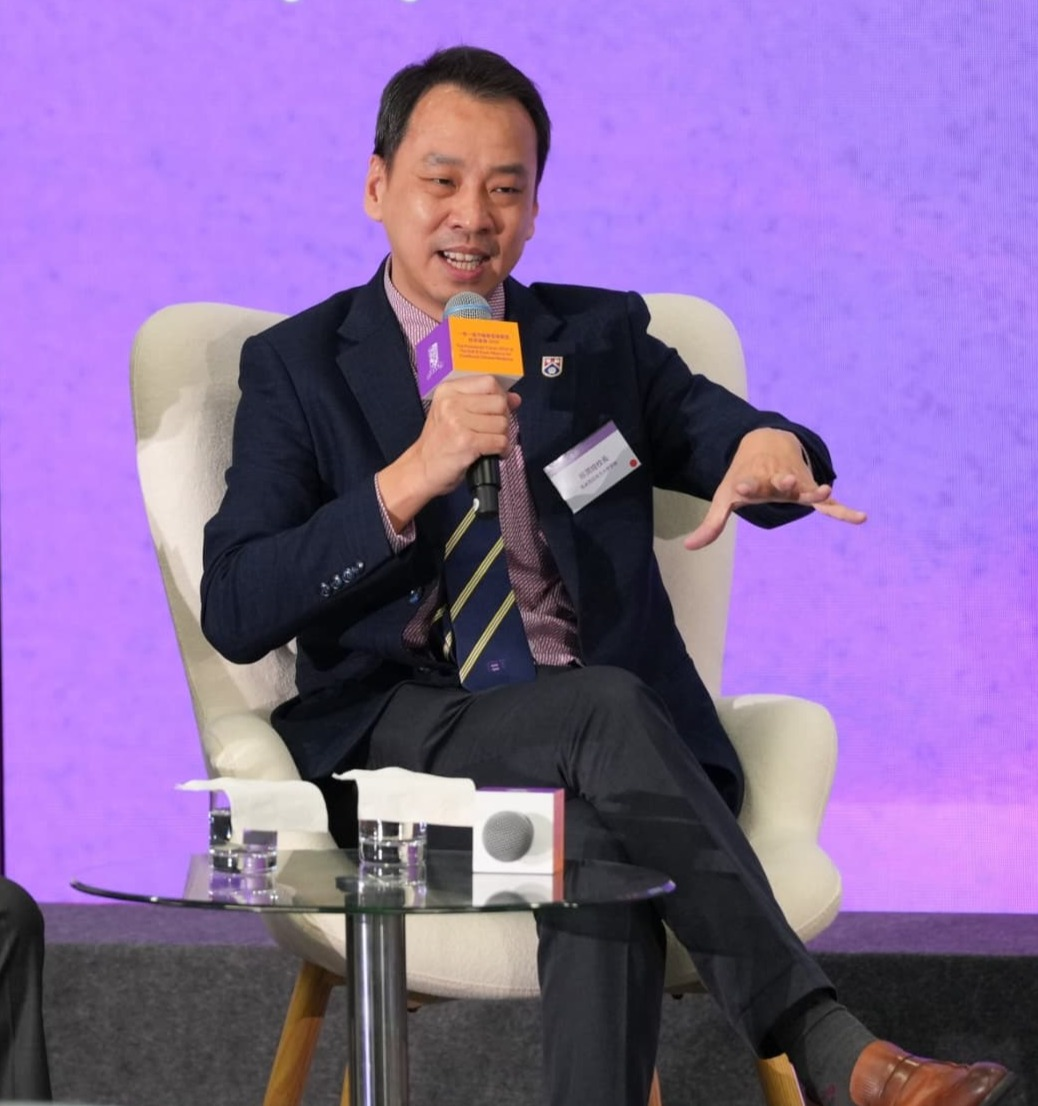
- Chuah in 2024

Personal details
- Born: 25 May 1976 (age 50) Kepong, Kuala Lumpur, Malaysia
- Education: Universiti Teknologi Malaysia; National University of Singapore; University of Cambridge; Wolfson College; Gonville and Caius College; Cambridge Judge Business School
- Occupation: President & CEO; Southern University College
- Scientific career
- Fields: Electrical Engineering
- Workplaces: University of Malaya; Southern University College
- Thesis: A Multi-pixel CMOS Photon Detector for the Scanning Electron Microscope (2012)

Chinese name
- Simplified Chinese: 蔡润煌
- Traditional Chinese: 蔡潤煌
Transcriptions
Standard Mandarin
- Hanyu Pinyin: Cài Rùn Huáng
Southern Min
- Hokkien POJ: Chhoà Jūn-hông

Chuah Joon Huang (simplified Chinese: 蔡润煌; traditional Chinese: 蔡潤煌; pinyin: Cài Rùn Huáng; Pe̍h-ōe-jī: Chhoà Jūn-hông), also known as David Chuah, is a Malaysian professional engineer, academician and university administrator who has served as the fourth President and Chief Executive Officer of Southern University College (Southern UC) in Johor Bahru, Malaysia. Chuah is known for his contributions to integrated circuit design, artificial intelligence (AI), computer vision, and higher education leadership in Malaysia and the ASEAN region.

== Education ==
Chuah obtained a Bachelor of Engineering (B.Eng.) from Universiti Teknologi Malaysia (UTM). He then earned a Master of Engineering (M.Eng.) from the National University of Singapore (NUS), followed by a Master of Philosophy (M.Phil.) in Technology Policy and a Doctor of Philosophy (Ph.D.) from the University of Cambridge, where he was matriculated at Wolfson College and Gonville and Caius College. He is a Kuok Foundation Scholar and a Commonwealth Scholar.

== Career ==
Chuah has worked in the semiconductor industry, including at Intel as an Integrated Circuit Design Engineer and at Freescale Semiconductor (formerly Motorola, SPS and presently NXP Semiconductors) as a Senior Product Development Engineer and Senior Test Engineer. He began his academic career at the University of Malaya, where he served as a professor in Electrical Engineering and was the head of programme for Master of Mechatronic Engineering and director of the VLSI and Image Processing Research Group.

On 1 March 2024, Chuah was appointed President and CEO of Southern UC. In September 2024, he was additionally appointed Dean of the Faculty of Engineering and Information Technology. Under his leadership, Southern UC has expanded STEM and AI research programs, established collaborations with industry to support the Johor–Singapore Special Economic Zone (JS-SEZ) and strengthened international academic partnerships.

In recognition of his well-established reputation in research, Chuah has been appointed as a thesis advisor of Korea Advanced Institute of Science and Technology (KAIST), a Visiting Professor of Xiamen University and an International Collaborative Partner of Universiti Tunku Abdul Rahman (UTAR).

Chuah has contributed to AI development through regional leadership and advocacy for people-centered AI governance, actively promoting China-ASEAN collaboration, ethical frameworks, and capacity building in artificial intelligence. He is passionate about nurturing future generations through his enthusiasm for STEM education and commitment to inspiring young people to pursue careers in STEM fields. In addition, he is a strong advocate for sustainable development, championing the advancement of the United Nations Sustainable Development Goals (SDGs) in support of UNESCO's global mission.

== Professional affiliations ==
Chuah is active and has held leadership roles in multiple engineering organizations, including Chairman Emeritus of Institution of Engineering and Technology (IET) Malaysia Network, Vice President of the Institution of Engineers, Malaysia (IEM), Secretary-General of the ASEAN Federation of Engineering Organisations (AFEO), and Honorary Treasurer of IEEE Computational Intelligence Society (CIS) Malaysia Chapter. He has been appointed by the Malaysian Ministry of Works as a Board Member of the Board of Engineers Malaysia (BEM).

Apart from engineering organizations, Chuah has served in the Disciplinary Committee Panel of Advocates and Solicitors Disciplinary Board (ASDB), Bar Council. He has been appointed as a Fulbright Ambassador to promote Fulbright scholarships, fostering academic exchange and strengthening cross-cultural understanding between Malaysia and the United States.

== Awards and recognition ==
Chuah has been recognized nationally and internationally for his contributions to academia and engineering such as Honorary Fellow of the ASEAN Federation of Engineering Organisations, Fellow of ASEAN Academy of Engineering and Technology, Fellow of Academy of Engineering and Technology of the Developing World, Top10 in Education, National Outstanding Educationist Award, Industry Icon Award in Educational Leadership and Management, and The Best CEO of the Year.

== Selected works ==
- Ali, Raza; Chuah, Joon Huang; Abu Talip, Mohamad Sofian; Mokhtar, Norrima; Shoaib, Muhammad Ali (2021). "Structural crack detection using deep convolutional neural networks". Automation in Construction. 133. doi:10.1016/j.autcon.2021.103989.
- Soon, Foo Chong; Khaw, Hui Ying; Chuah, Joon Huang; Kanesan, Jeevan (2018). "Hyper-parameters optimisation of deep CNN architecture for vehicle logo recognition". IET Intelligent Transport Systems. 12 (8): 939–946. doi:10.1049/iet-its.2018.5127.
- Han, Yi; Wang, Biyao; Guan, Tian; Tian, Di; Yang, Guangfeng; Wei, Wei; Tang, Hongbo; Chuah, Joon Huang (2023). "Research on road environmental sense method of intelligent vehicle based on tracking check". IEEE Transactions on Intelligent Transportation Systems. 24 (1): 1261–1275. doi:10.1109/TITS.2022.3183893.
- Chuah, Joon Huang; Holburn, David (2015). "Design of Low-Noise High-Gain CMOS Transimpedance Amplifier for Intelligent Sensing of Secondary Electrons". IEEE Sensors Journal. 15 (10): 5997–6004. doi:10.1109/JSEN.2015.2452934.
- Wong, Kum Yeen; Chuah, Joon Huang; Hope, Chris (2019). "As an emerging economy, should Malaysia adopt carbon taxation?". Energy & Environment. 30 (1): 91–108. doi:10.1177/0958305X18787273.
