= List of honorary fellows of Wolfson College, Cambridge =

This is a list of Honorary Fellows of Wolfson College, Cambridge. A full list is available at

- Cristina Bicchieri
- Sir Leszek Borysiewicz
- Nigel Bridge, Baron Bridge of Harwich
- William Brown
- Lawrence Collins, Baron Collins of Mapesbury
- Suzanne Cory
- David Crystal
- William H. Gates Sr.
- Sir David Grant
- Anthony Green
- Sir Michael Hardie Boys
