= Wolfson College, Cambridge =

College of the University of Cambridge

Coordinates: 52.1982°N 0.1012°E

Wolfson College
- University of Cambridge
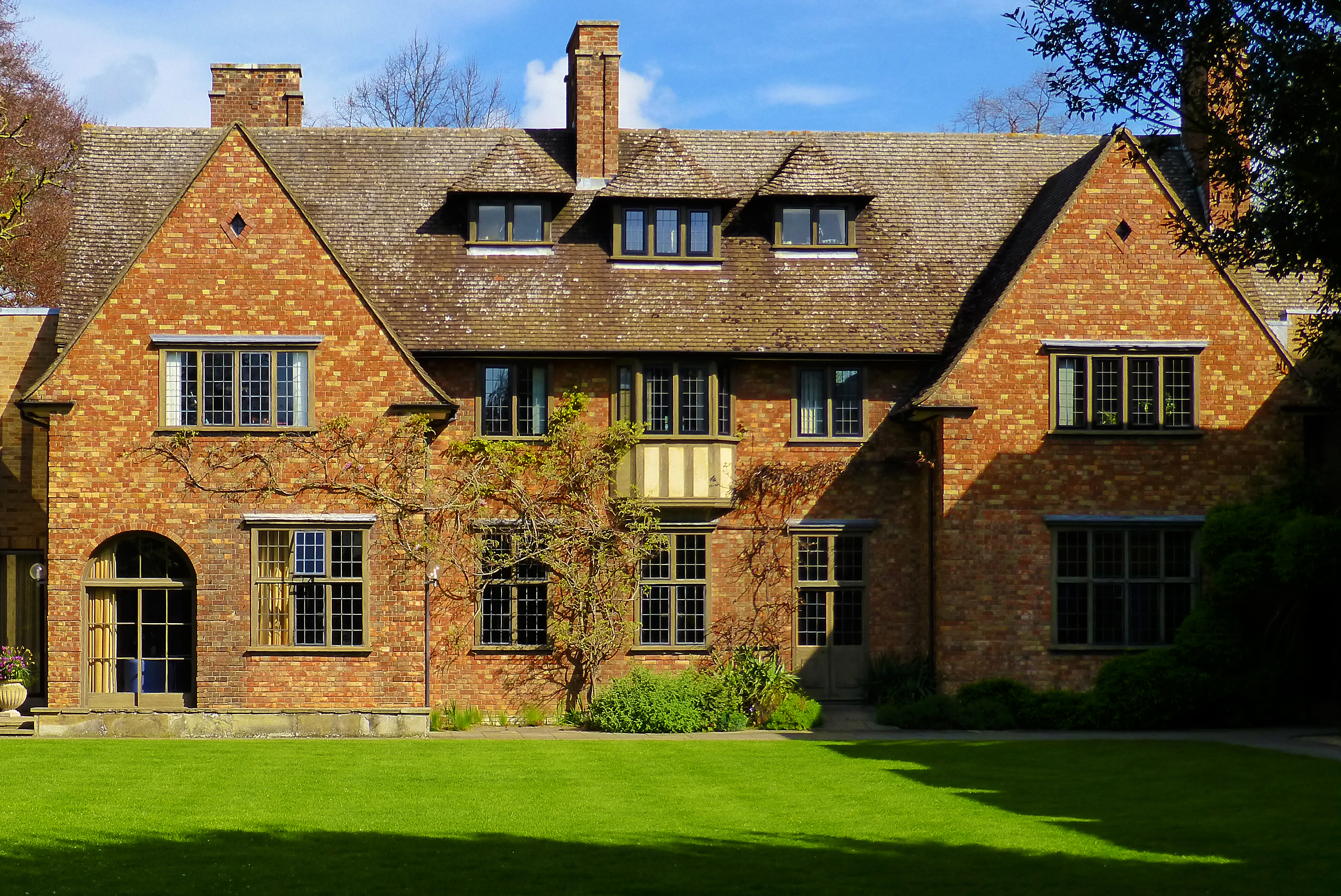
- Bredon House, Wolfson College

- Arms: Ermine a chevron gules between in chief two lions passant guardant or, and in base a handbell proper
Scarf colours: red, with two equally-spaced narrow golden stripes edged with white
- Location: Barton Road, Cambridge (map)
- Abbreviation: W
- Motto: "Ring True"
- Founder: University of Cambridge
- Established: 1965
- Named after: Wolfson Foundation
- Former names: University College (1965–1972)
- Age restriction: Aged 21 or over
- Sister college: St Antony's College, Oxford
- President: Dame Ijeoma Uchegbu
- Undergraduates: 167 (2024-25)
- Postgraduates: 915 (2024-25)
- Fellows: 106 (2017)
- Endowment: £42m (2025)
- Website: wolfson.cam.ac.uk
- Students' association: wolfson.cam.ac.uk/wcsa/
- Boat club: Wolfson College Boat Club

Map
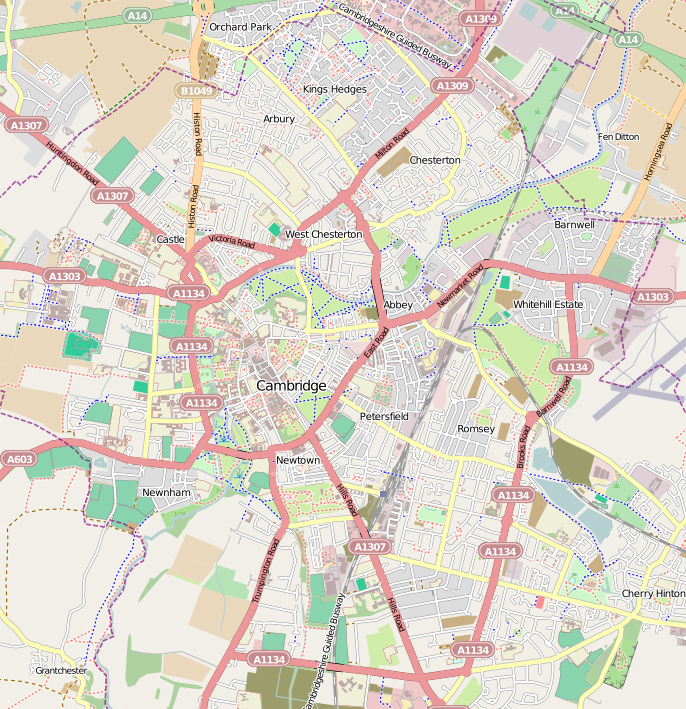
- Location within Cambridge

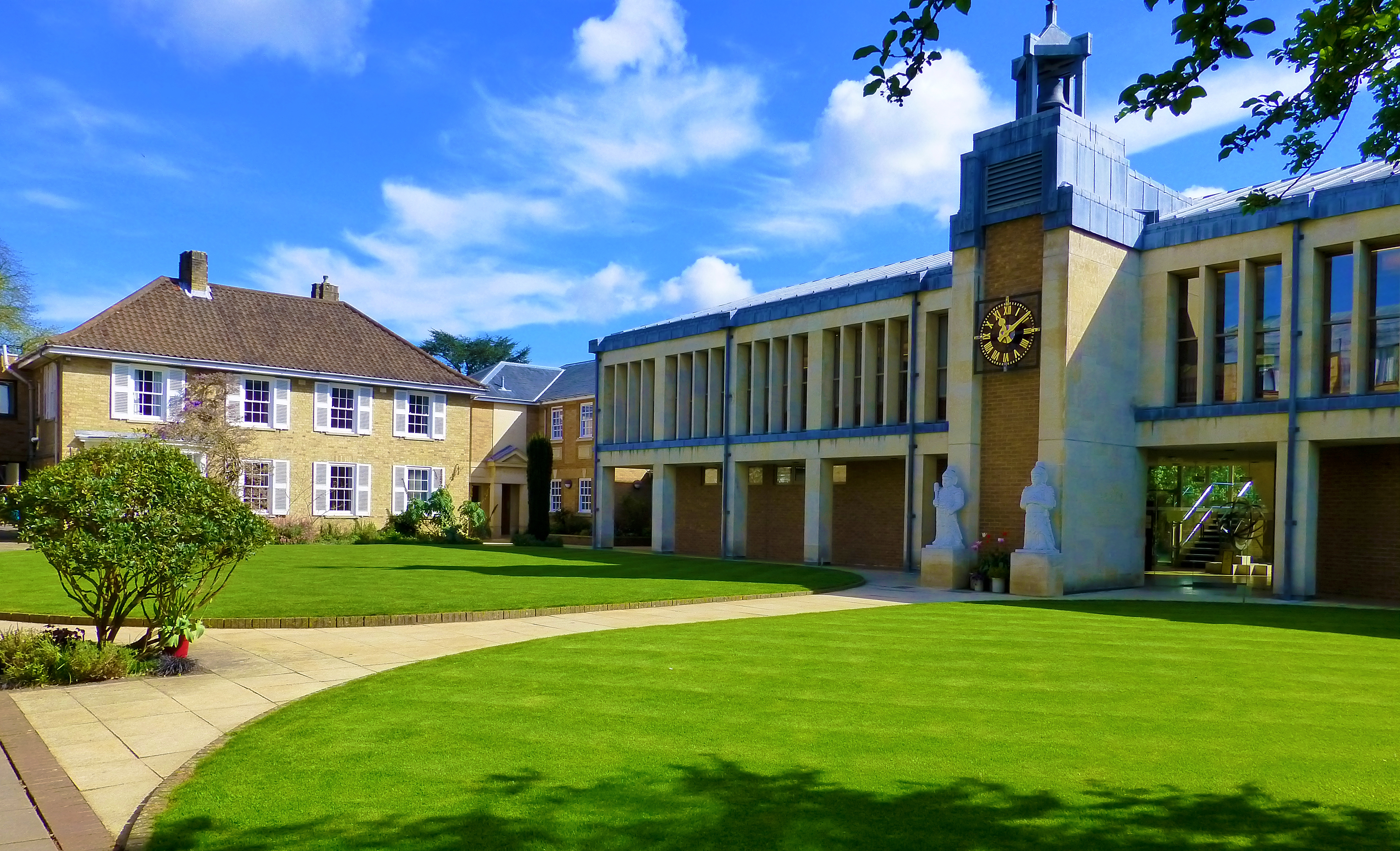
The Lee Library

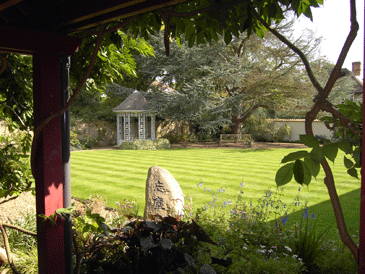
Lee Gardens

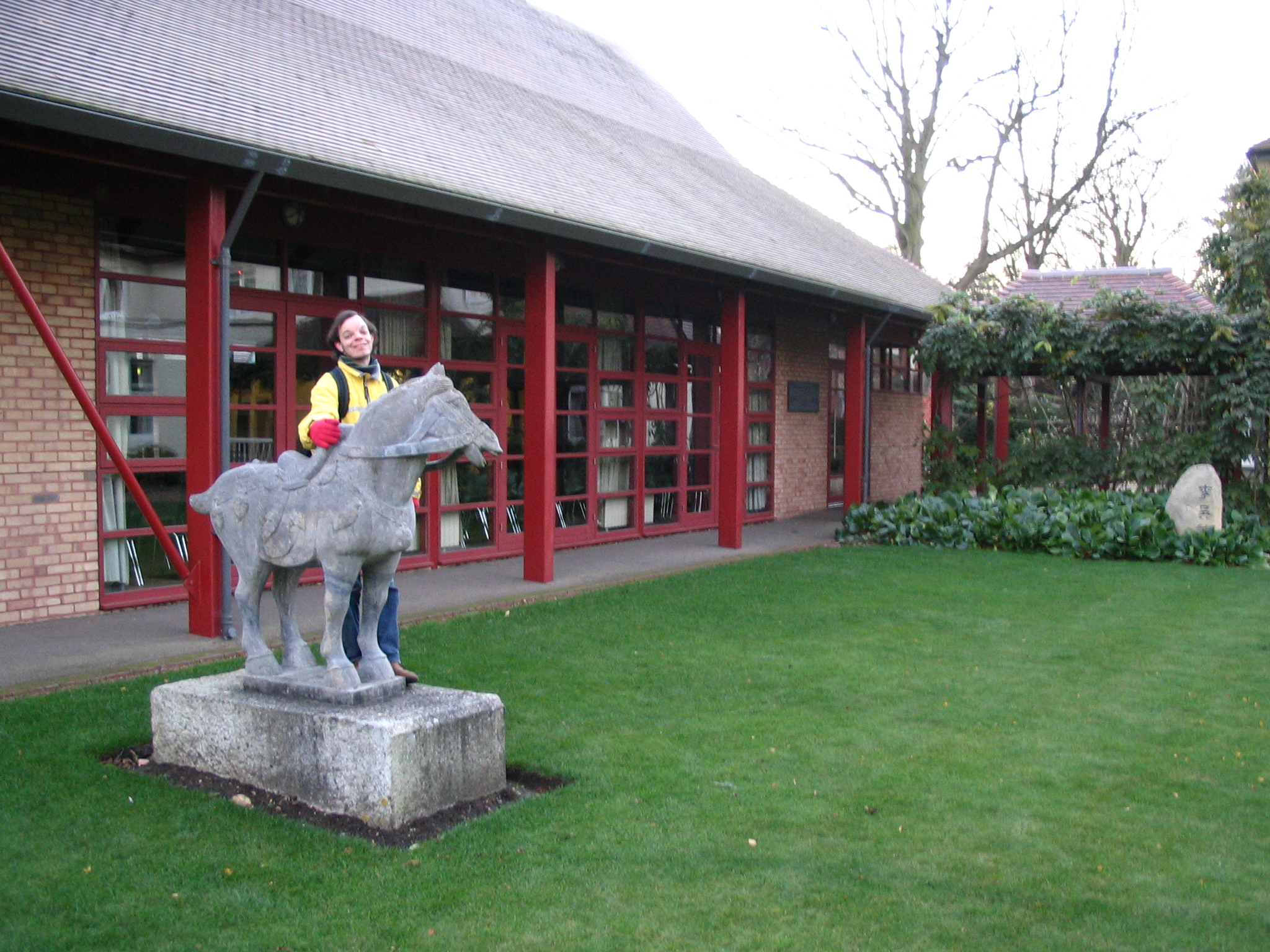
The Chinese-style Lee Hall

Wolfson College (/ˈwʊlfsən/) is a constituent college of the University of Cambridge, England. The majority of students at the college are postgraduates. The college also admits "mature" undergraduates (aged 21 and above), with around 15% of students studying undergraduate degree courses at the university. The college was founded in 1965 as "University College", but was refounded as Wolfson College in 1973 in recognition of a benefaction of the Wolfson Foundation. Wolfson is located to the south-west of Cambridge city centre.

As one of the more modern colleges in Cambridge, Wolfson does not follow all of the traditions of some of the university's older colleges. For example, since the college's founding there has been no "High Table" reserved for Fellows at Formal Hall dinners; students and Fellows mix and dine together, and the tradition of wearing academic gowns to such occasions is encouraged but is not compulsory. Both Fellows and students at the college have access to all the facilities. With students from over 70 countries, Wolfson claims to be one of Cambridge's most cosmopolitan colleges. It was the first college of the university to admit men and women as both students and Fellows.The current President of Wolfson College is scientist Ijeoma Uchegbu.

== History ==
After the Second World War, the number of graduates of other universities who went to Cambridge to do research increased significantly. The university therefore decided to found University College in 1965 to help accommodate these students. The college was based at Bredon House, a property built in the early twentieth century by John Stanley Gardiner, who was a Professor of Zoology at the university from 1909 to 1937. He donated the house, with its long narrow garden running from Barton Road to Selwyn Gardens, to the university upon his death in 1946. The college then purchased further property on its eastern boundary.

University College was opened on 30 June 1965 as a college for postgraduate students, with the classicist John Sinclair Morrison as its first President. At the time, all the undergraduate colleges of the university were single-sex institutions and University College was the first in the university to admit men and women as both students and Fellows. The college, from its outset, set out to be a cosmopolitan and egalitarian institution with distinct differences from the older, more traditional Cambridge colleges, with no Senior Combination Room, no "High Table" reserved for Fellows at formal dinners in the college and no portraits hung in the Dining Hall.

The college's founding deed required the college to either find an endowment within 10 years or face dissolution. In 1972, the Wolfson Foundation agreed to provide a capital endowment and help to fund the construction of central buildings around Bredon House and the college's East and West Courts. In recognition of this, the college was renamed Wolfson College on 1 January 1973.

The new buildings (designed by the architect Michael Mennim) were opened by Queen Elizabeth II and the Duke of Edinburgh in 1977. Though most of the college's buildings are modern, the design of the campus is similar to that of the university's older colleges, with buildings grouped around two main courts. The floor of the entrance hall to the main building is made of thin slices of granite taken from the old London Bridge (the main section of which was taken to Arizona to be rebuilt in the late 1960s).

Further building and acquisition of neighbouring properties has continued. In the 1980s, the college purchased the house and garden owned by Sir Vivian Fuchs on the western side on the college. Plommer House on the northern side of the college was also left to the college in his will by Hugh Plommer, a founding Fellow of the college. The acquisition of property has allowed for the building of a number of new facilities, mainly funded by donations from philanthropic foundations and individuals. Other major benefactions have come from the Fairleigh Dickinson Foundation and the Toda Foundation. In the 1990s, with the help of the Gatsby Foundation, the college purchased the "western field" on which was built the Chancellor's Centre and further residential blocks.

== Buildings and grounds ==
=== The Lee Library ===
Opened in 1994, the Lee Seng Tee Library (Lee Library) was donated to the college by the Singaporean businessman and philanthropist Lee Seng Tee (whose daughter studied at the college). Lee also donated the funds used to build the Lee Seng Tee Hall. The library was designed by architects Brewer, Smith and Brewer. The ground floor foyer contains a scale model of the armillary sphere on the roof of the Peking Observatory. On the first floor is a bust of Lee Kong Chian, father of the benefactor. The library contains over 60 quiet places to work and is open 24 hours a day all year. The college is located a short walk from the University Library.

In February 2018, students at the college were evacuated from the Lee library, and a number of accommodation blocks, after a WWII practice grenade was found in the President's Garden. There were no injuries and it was soon discovered that the device was a practice grenade with no live ammunition.

=== College Gardens ===
In the first half of the twentieth century, much of the land on which the college is now situated comprised gardens which belonged to houses in Selwyn Gardens. As the college grew particular natural landmarks, such as the mulberry tree outside the Porters' lodge, were retained as features. The garden comprises a wide variety of trees, scented shrubs, dwarf conifers, as well as a distinctive range of shrubs with colourful stems.

The college's head gardener occasionally provides a guided tour of the gardens to local interested groups. During the summer, Wolfson opens its gardens to the public as part of the NGS Open Gardens network.

== Student life ==
The college is known for its entertainment events and performances, which attract visitors from many other colleges of the university. These activities include formal dinners, concerts, dancing nights, and music displays. The college frequently hosts live comedy nights, called the Wolfson Howler, featuring acts performed by comedians ranging from fellow students to internationally recognised names.

The Club Room, at the heart of the college, includes the college bar and a dance floor space, and is a café during the day. It is the main communal space for students, and is the venue for many entertainment events.

The Wolfson College Boat Club is a popular society, and Wolfson is one of the strongest graduate rowing colleges in Cambridge.

The college is also a constituent member of the All Greys, the Cambridge mature college rugby side.

== People associated with the college ==
=== Notable alumni ===
Name	Birth	Death	Career
Dame Sara Thornton	1962		Former chair of the National Police Chiefs' Council and chief of Thames Valley Police, and Independent Anti-Slavery Commissioner
Laura Sandys	1964		Former Conservative MP for Thanet South (2010–15), chair of the European Movement UK and the Energy Data Taskforce
Rupiah Banda	1937	2022	Former President of Zambia
Frederick Kayanja	1938		Ugandan physician and academic
Song Sang-Hyun	1941		President of the International Criminal Court
Ruth Dudley Edwards	1944		Irish historian and biographer
Shahid Aziz Siddiqi	1945	2019	Vice-Chancellor of Ziauddin Medical University and former Federal Secretary in the Government of Pakistan
Matthew Fisher	1946		English composer and member of Procol Harum
Ken Yeang	1948		Malaysian skyscraper architect
Cristina Bicchieri	1950		Philosopher and SJP Harvie Professor of Social Thought and Comparative Ethics in the Philosophy Department at the University of Pennsylvania
Conor Gearty	1957		Professor of human rights law at the London School of Economics, Director of the Institute of Public Affairs, and former Director of the Centre for the Study of Human Rights
Susan Kiefel	1954		Chief Justice of the High Court of Australia
Carrie Lam	1957		Former Chief Executive of Hong Kong. (Awarded Honorary Fellowship in 2017, but resigned in 2020 after the college raised concerns about her commitment to the protection of human rights and the freedom of expression in handling 2019 Hong Kong protests.)
Tharman Shanmugaratnam	1957		President of Singapore
Andrew Tyrie	1957		Member of the House of Lords, former Conservative Member of Parliament for Chichester 1997–2017
Sabiha Sumar	1961		Pakistani film maker
Letsie III of Lesotho	1963		King of Lesotho
Zhang Xin	1965		Chinese business magnate and seventh-richest self-made woman in the world
Einat Wilf	1970		Israeli politician
William Bortrick	1973		Genealogist, chairman of Burke's Peerage
Chuah Joon Huang	1976		Malaysian professional engineer and university administrator, President of Southern University College
Tszwai So	1981		Architect
Eric Monkman	1987		University Challenge finalist and team captain

=== Notable Fellows ===
- Sir Leszek Borysiewicz – Vice-Chancellor of Cambridge University
- Duncan Maskell – Senior Pro-Vice-Chancellor of Cambridge University
- Lawson Soulsby
- Timothy Winter
- Hilary Wayment
- Nicholas de Lange - Professor of Hebrew and Jewish Studies
- Roger Needham - computer scientist and Founding Fellow of the College
- Karen Spärck Jones - computer scientist and Fellow from 1966 to 2002.
- Rex Walford – geographer and educator

=== Presidents ===
The head of Wolfson College is called the President.

- 1966 to 1980: John Sinclair Morrison
- 1980 to 1992: Sir David Williams
- 1993: Sir John Tusa; January to October
- 1993 to 2010: Gordon Johnson
- 2010 to 2017: Sir Richard Evans
- 2017 to 2024: Jane Clarke
- since 2024: Dame Ijeoma Uchegbu

== See also ==
- Wolfson College, Oxford
- List of Honorary Fellows of Wolfson College, Cambridge
- Wolfson family
