= Tszwai So =

British architect

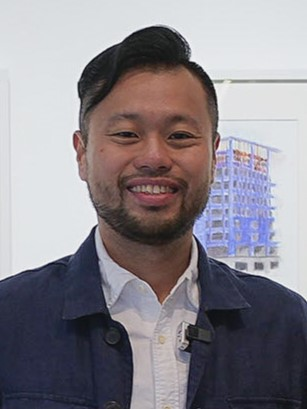
- Born: Hong Kong
- Education: University of Hong Kong, University of Cambridge
- Occupation: Architect
- Awards: EU Mies van der Rohe Award Nominee (2019) World Architecture Festival Award (2018); RIBAJ EyeLine Award (2018); AIA UK Young Architect of the Year (2017); New London People’s Choice Award (2017); RIBA London Award (2017); RIBA Journal Rising Star Award Civic Merit Medal of Belarus (2025) and others
- Practice: Spheron Architects
- Buildings: Belarusian Memorial Chapel
- Website: www.spheronarchitects.co.uk

Tszwai So (Chinese: 蘇子崴, born 1981) is a British-Hong Kong architect. He is best known for his Belarusian Memorial Chapel, which is the first wooden church built in London since the Great Fire in 1666.

== Biography ==
So grew up in British Hong Kong. He studied architecture at the University of Hong Kong, graduating in 2003 as the recipient of Ho Fook Prize in Architecture.

He later moved to the United Kingdom and studied for a master's degree in Building History at Wolfson College, University of Cambridge.

In 2011, he co-founded Spheron Architects with Samuel Bentil-Mensah, based in London and Accra. Their clients include Birkbeck College, Roman Catholic Diocese of Westminster, Holy See of Rome, Queen Mary University of London and Royal Borough of Kingston Upon Thames.

== Career ==
=== Architecture ===
==== Belarusian Memorial Chapel ====
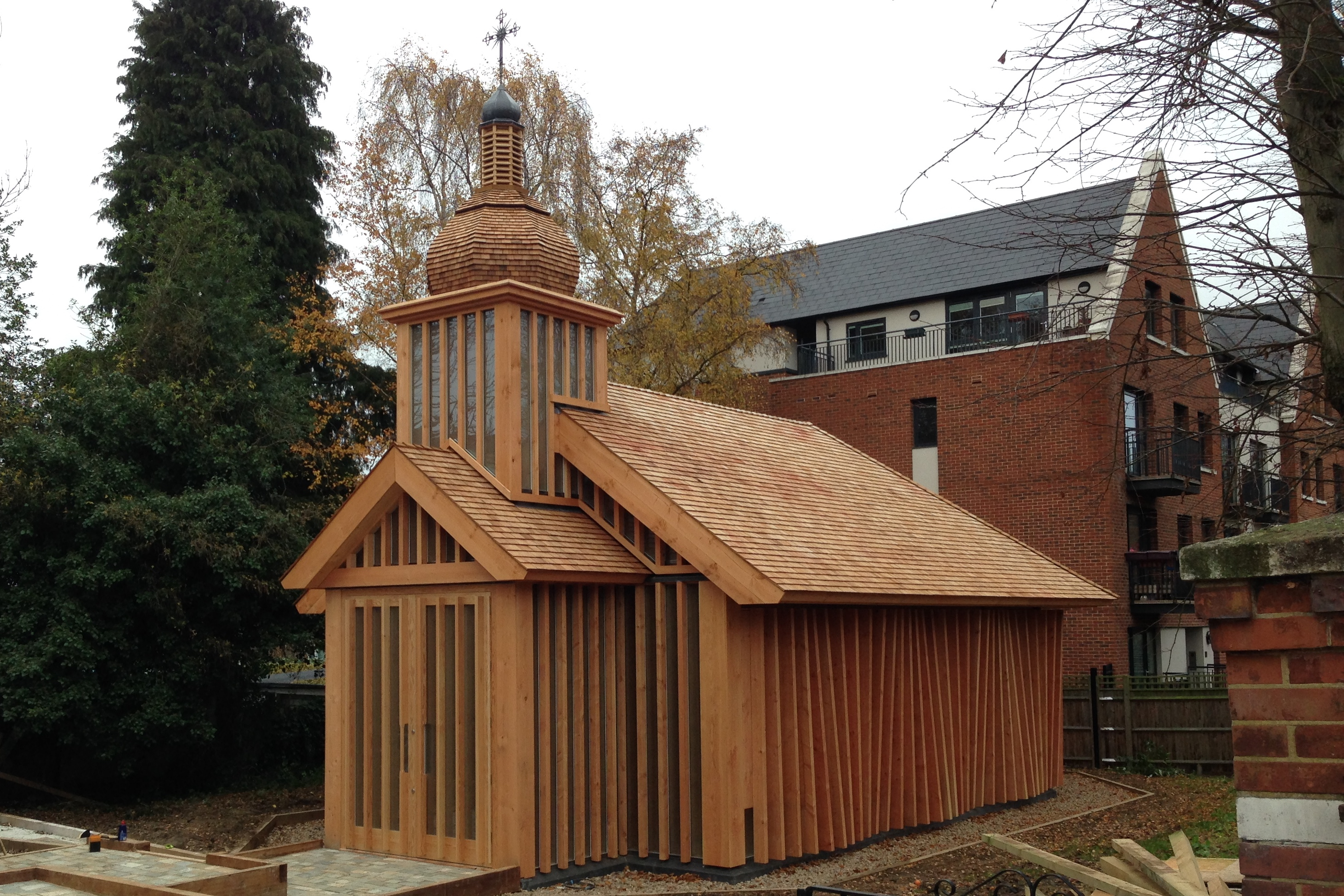
The Belarusian Memorial Chapel in London

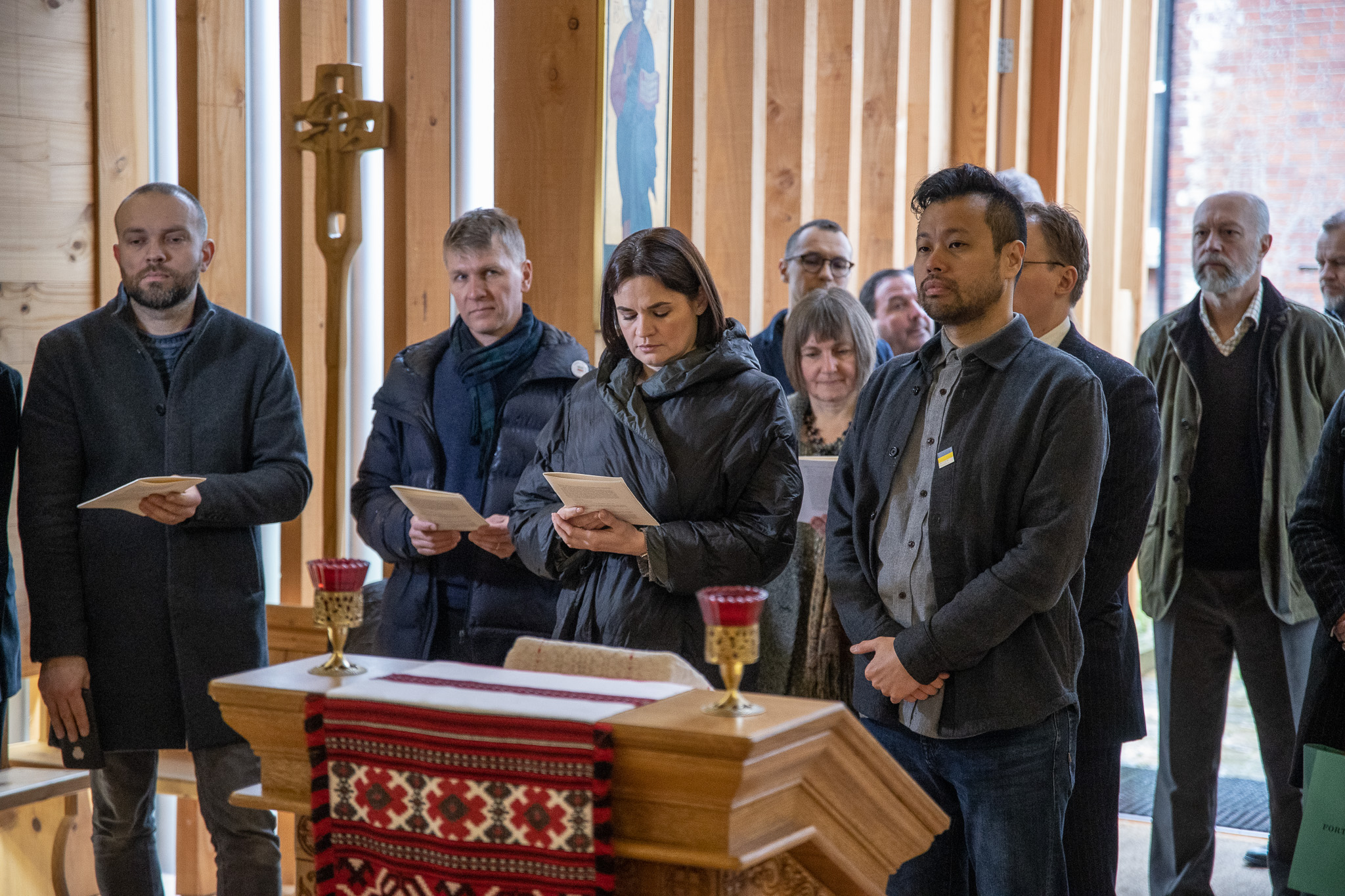
Tszwai So with Sviatlana Tsikhanouskaya at the Belarusian church in London in 2023

So first gained critical acclaim internationally with his Church of St. Cyril of Turau and All the Patron Saints of the Belarusian People (also known as the Belarusian Memorial Chapel) in London, commissioned by the Holy See of Rome and completed in 2017. It is the first wooden church built in London since the Great Fire in 1666. It won the public votes in the New London Architecture People's Choice Award 2017 and was nominated for the EU Prize in Contemporary Architecture - Mies Van der Rohe Award 2019, the highest accolade in European Architecture. It was chosen by the Royal Academy of Arts as one of the 10 buildings to see at Open House London 2017. Architizer has named it one of the 10 Catholic Churches Designed to Uplift and Inspire. On 21 October 2018, ArchDaily selected So's work among the best 32 chapels previously published on the site.

==== An Echo in Time, Belgium ====
In March 2018, an international jury had chosen So's anonymous entry entitled An Echo in Time as the winner of the EU-backed international competition for a proposal of the first ever pan-European memorial for all victims of the 20th century totalitarianism, to be built in Jean Rey Square in Brussels, Belgium. The jury included, among others, Norman Foster, Julie Beckman, László Tőkés and Tibor Navracsics. The competition was organized by the Platform of European Memory and Conscience.

==== Slonim Synagogue, Belarus ====
In August 2018, the Belarusian state television reported that Tszwai So had been working with the Foundation for Jewish Heritage in the UK, and Natasha Kaplinsky's family, on a $6 million restoration project for the Slonim Synagogue built in the 17th century, in Slonim, Belarus, Kaplinsky's ancestral home.

==== The Blue, Taiwan ====
In 2023-2024, Tszwai So authored the project of the reconstruction of The Blue hotel in Taipei, Taiwan. It is described as an example of Emotionalist architecture, inspired by the Belarus-based UNOVIS artist movement of the early 20th century. In 2026, The Blue was conferred the 26th Taipei Architecture Renovation Award by the Taipei City Government.

=== Drawings ===
So's drawings stemmed from his prizewinning design of An Echo in Time were chosen as the First Prize Winner in the practitioners’ category from an entry of 1,000 images worldwide in the RIBA Journal International Drawing Competition, the Eye Line Award in 2018. His drawings were exhibited at the Royal Institute of British Architects in London from 29 August until 12 September 2018, then at RIBA North in Liverpool til 30 October.

== Academia and other activities ==
So teaches at the University of Westminster.

He is a trustee of Heritage Trust Network, a nationwide charity which helps to save the built heritage of the UK, jointly funded by Heritage Lottery Fund, the Architectural Heritage Fund, Historic England, National Trust for Scotland, Historic Environment Scotland, Cadw, Pilgrim Trust and the Headley Trust. So is an authority on Belarusian Wooden Church Heritage and Victorian architecture by George Truefitt, and has published papers on both subjects in the RIBA Journal.

== Awards and recognition ==
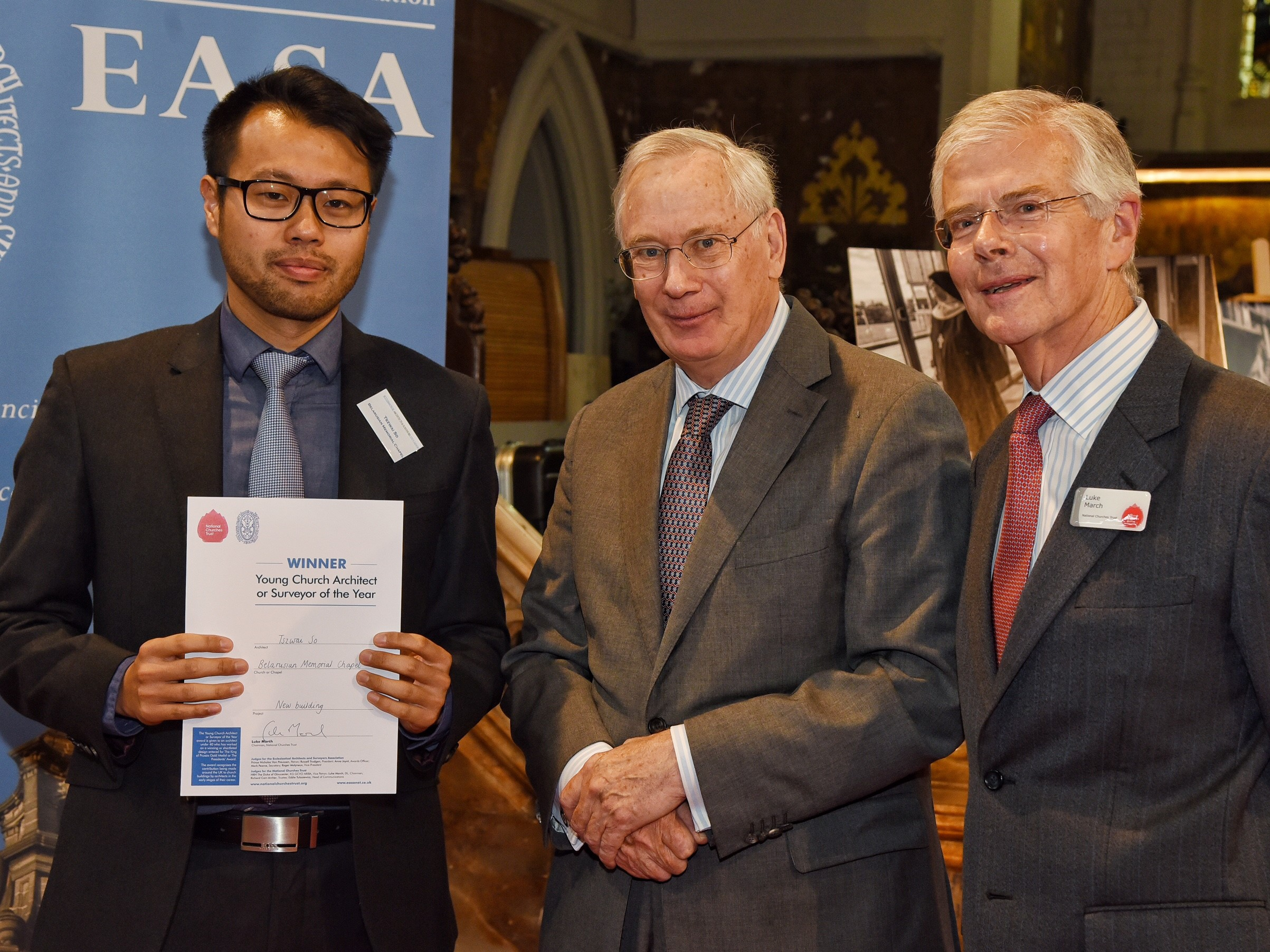
Tszwai So from Spheron Architects, architect of the Belarusian Memorial Chapel in London, winner of the Young Church Architect or Surveyor of the Year

Tszwai So and the practice have been nominated for and won a number of awards. He was named a rising star in British Architecture by the RIBA Journal on 31 October 2016. He was named the best UK young architect under the age of 40 in 2017 by the American Institute of Architects.

On 26 October 2017, in recognition of his contribution to church buildings in the early stage of his career, So was presented the Young Church Architect of the Year Award by The Duke of Gloucester, who was one of the judges of the jury on behalf of National Churches Trust, a charity under the patronage of Queen Elizabeth II.

In November 2018, it was announced that Belarusian Memorial Chapel had been nominated for the EU Prize for contemporary Architecture - the Mies van der Rohe Award. On 29 November 2018, the church won the Religious Building of the Year award at the 2018 World Architecture Festival held in Amsterdam.

In 2025, Tszwai So received the Civic Merit Medal of Belarus from the leader of Belarusian democratic forces Sviatlana Tsikhanouskaya, alongside other foreigners who contributed to the development of democracy, support to Belarusians, and promotion of Belarusian culture abroad.
