= Ijeoma Uchegbu =

Nigerian-British pharmacist (born 1960)

Dame Ijeoma Uchegbu DBE
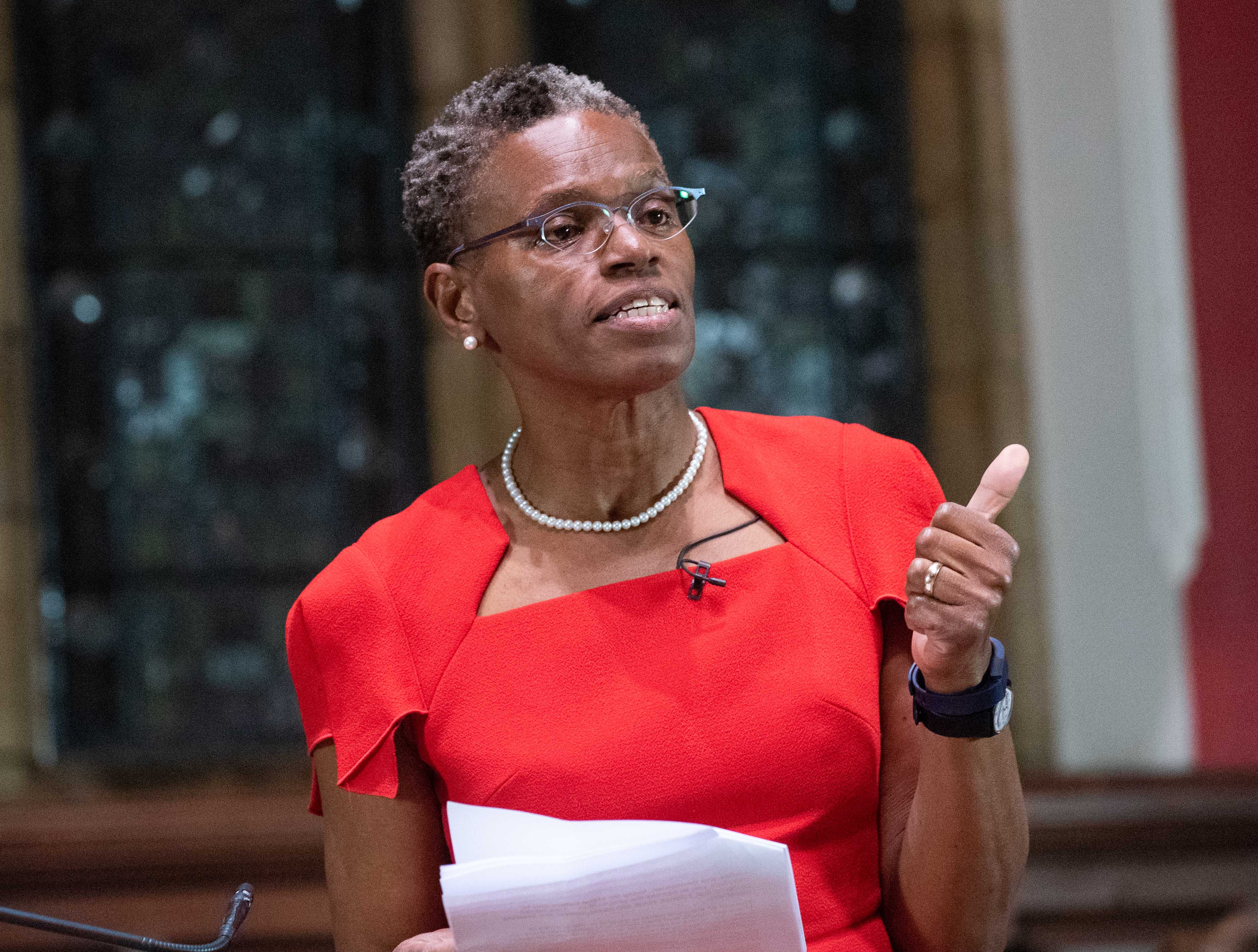
- Uchegbu at the Oxford Union Science Debate 2018
- Born: 16 August 1960 (age 66)
- Education: University of Benin; University of Lagos; University of London
- Known for: Nanoparticle drug delivery
- Scientific career
- Workplaces: University of Strathclyde; University College London
- Website: http://www.nanomerics.com

Dame Ijeoma Florence Uchegbu (born 16 August 1960) is President of Wolfson College, Cambridge and a Nigerian-British professor of pharmacy at University College London, where she previously held the position of Pro-Vice Provost for Africa and the Middle East.

She is the Chief Scientific Officer of Nanomerics, a pharmaceutical nanotechnology company specialising in drug delivery solutions for poorly water-soluble drugs, nucleic acids and peptides. She is also a Governor of the Wellcome Trust, a large biomedical research charity. Apart from her highly cited scientific research in pharmaceutical nanoscience, Uchegbu is also known for her work in science public engagement and equality and diversity in Science, Technology, Engineering and Mathematics (STEM). In December 2023, she was announced as the next President of Wolfson College, Cambridge, and took office in October 2024. Uchegbu was appointed DBE in the New Year Honours List, 2025. In 2026 Uchegbu’s popular science book - Chain Reaction - was published in multiple languages.

== Education and early career ==
Ijeoma Uchegbu grew up in Hackney, London, and South East Nigeria. She studied pharmacy at the University of Benin, graduating in 1981, and earned her Masters degree at the University of Lagos, but was unable to complete her PhD in Nigeria due to infrastructure difficulties in the 1980s.

"I came into science simply because after training as a pharmacist I wanted something a little bit more challenging to do. I thought that being a researcher would be a great place to start. As I did my pharmacy degree at Nigeria’s University of Benin, I did give research a try in Nigeria, but the infrastructure difficulties in the eighties made this virtually impossible. I came back to the UK, having emigrated 17 years earlier from the UK to Nigeria and started looking around for opportunities."

== Later career ==
She moved back to the UK and, as a mature student with three young children, completed her postgraduate studies at the University of London, graduating with a PhD in 1997. She was appointed a lecturer at the University of Strathclyde from 2002 to 2004.

Uchegbu was elected President of Wolfson College, Cambridge, taking up the post on 1 October 2024.

== Research ==
Uchegbu was made a Professor of Drug Delivery at the University of Strathclyde in 2002. Here she worked on polymer self-assembly, identifying materials that could form stable nanosystems. She demonstrated that polymer molecular weight could be used to control the size of vesicles.

She joined University College London in 2006 as a Professor of Pharmaceutical Nanoscience at the School of Pharmacy. Uchegbu leads a research group that investigate molecular design and dosage of pharmaceuticals. She has designed polymers that self-assemble into nanoparticles with the appropriate properties to transport drugs. She explores how nanoparticles can be used for drug delivery. Uchegbu holds several patents for drug delivery, and biocompatible polymers. Her pharmaceuticals deliver genes and siRNA to tumours and peptides to the brain as well as encouraging the absorption of hydrophobic drugs using nanoparticles. She is exploring how nanomedicine can be used to treat brain tumours.

In 2018, she was part of a £5.7 million Engineering and Physical Sciences Research Council grant, Raman Nanotheranostics, that will use gold nanoparticles to identify disease and light to destroy diseased cells. She also works with magnetic nanoparticles.

=== Nanomerics ===
In 2010, Uchegbu with Andreas Schätzlein founded Nanomerics, a pharmaceutical company that uses nanotechnology platforms to develop medicine. Uchegbu is the Chief Scientific Officer of Nanomerics, developing structures that can transport antibodies that can cross the blood–brain barrier. Nanomerics develop molecular envelope technology nanoparticles from amphiphilic polymers that self-assemble. Uchegbu won the Royal Society of Chemistry Emerging Technologies prize for their molecular envelope technology in 2017.

== Professional service ==
Uchegbu serves on the editorial board of the Journal of Controlled Release. She has served as the scientific secretary of the Controlled Release Society. She is editor-in-chief of Pharmaceutical Nanotechnology. She is on the healthcare strategy advisory team of the Engineering and Physical Sciences Research Council. She was involved in the University College London celebrations of the National Health Service turning seventy. In 2007, she was chosen for the Women of Outstanding Achievement in SET photographic exhibition that was displayed at the Science Museum and the British Museum.

In 2015, Uchegbu was appointed Pro-Vice Provost for Africa and the Middle East. She chairs the Africa and Middle East regional network at University College London (UCL), building partnerships and starting collaborative teams, welcoming international visitors and supporting student recruitment.

== Public engagement and equality and diversity ==
Uchegbu is involved in public engagement and science communication and featured on BBC Woman's Hour discussing her research into how nanoparticles can be used to help deliver drugs to the body, BBC Radio 4's The Life Scientific and has taken part in Soapbox Science, an international science outreach programme promoting women scientists and the work they do to members of the public. In April 2026, Uchegbu featured on the BBC Radio 3 programme, Private Passions, talking about her life, research and career.

Uchegbu is also involved in equality and diversity activities and programmes, acting as the UCL Provost's Envoy for Race Equality and featuring as the only Black British Role Model for the Women's Engineering Society. She also serves on the University College London Race Equality Charter self-assessment team. She is part of the Black Female Professors Forum, representing one of the 55 female professors of colour and one of the 25 Black female professors in the UK in 2017.

== Books ==
- 2000: Synthetic Surfactant Vesicles: Niosomes and Other Non-phospholipid Vesicular Systems: 11 (Drug Targeting and Delivery)
- 2006: Polymers in Drug Delivery
- 2013: Fundamentals of Pharmaceutical Nanoscience
- 2026: Chain Reaction - The Wondrous Chemistry of Everyday Life

== Awards and honours ==
- 2007: UK Department for Business, Innovation and Skills Women of Outstanding Achievement in Science Engineering and Technology
- 2012: Royal Pharmaceutical Society Pharmaceutical Scientist of the Year
- 2013: Academy of Pharmaceutical Sciences Eminent Fellow
- 2013: Controlled Release Society College of Fellows
- 2016: Academy of Pharmaceutical Sciences Innovative Science Award
- 2019: Honorary Doctorate Degree awarded by Lincoln University
- 2021: Fellow of the Academy of Medical Sciences
- 2021: Honorary Fellow of the Royal Society of Chemistry
- 2024: Honorary Doctorate Degree awarded by the University of West London
- 2024: Honorary Doctorate Degree awarded by Sheffield Hallam University
- 2024: Appointed Dame Commander of the Most Excellent Order of the British Empire (DBE), for services to the chemical sciences and to inclusion and diversity.
