= Slonim Synagogue =

Former synagogue in Slonim, Belarus

- Belarusian: Вялікая сінагога Слоніма
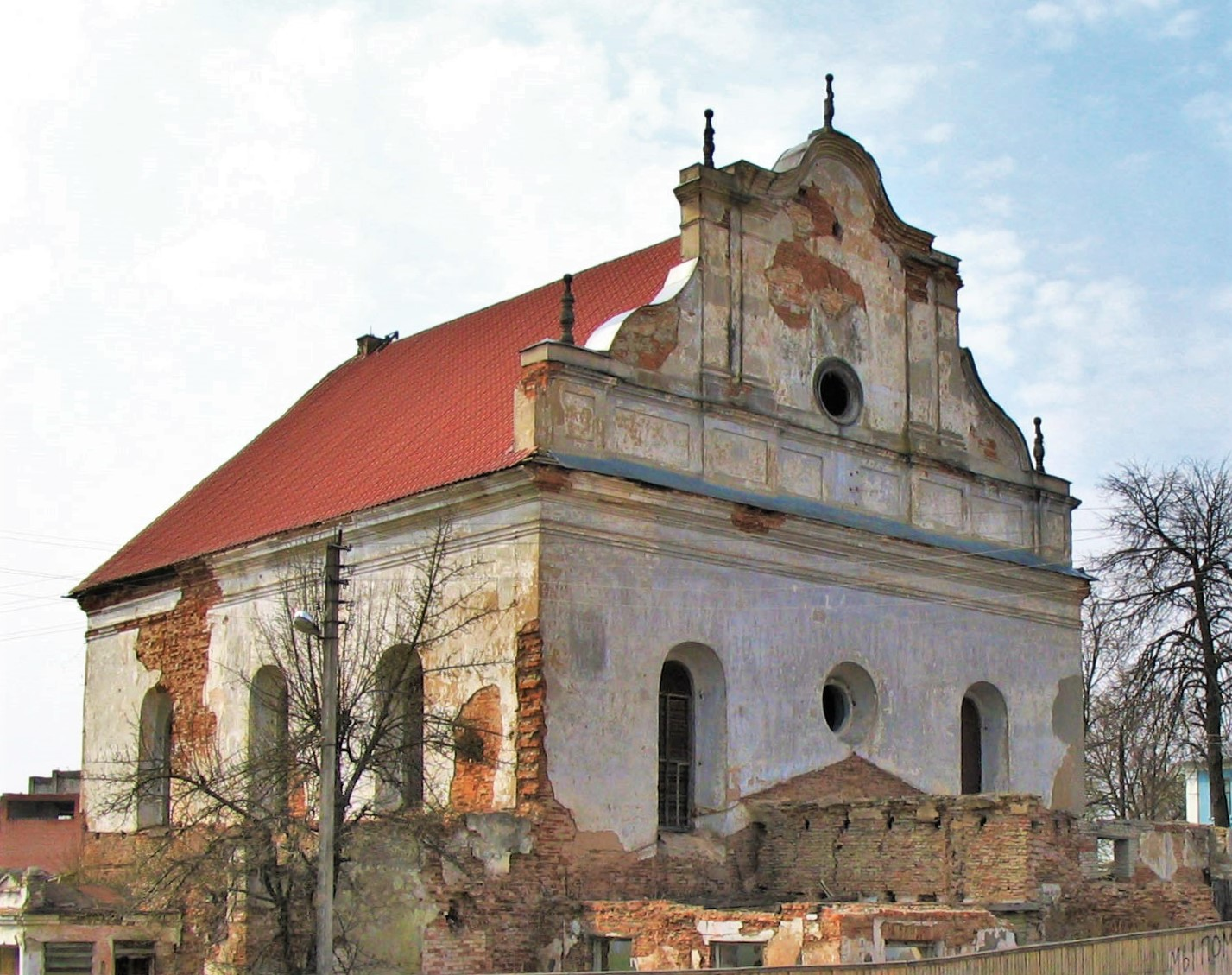
- The former synagogue, in 2006

- Location of the former synagogue in Belarus

Religion
- Affiliation: Judaism (former)
- Ecclesiastical or organisational status: Synagogue (1648–c. 1939)
- Status: Abandoned

Location
- Location: Slonim
- Country: Belarus
- Coordinates: 53°5′37″N 25°19′3″E

Architecture
- Type: Synagogue architecture
- Style: Baroque
- Completed: 1648
- Direction of façade: East

The Great Synagogue in Slonim (Belarusian: Вялікая сінагога Слоніма), or simply the Slonim Synagogue (Belarusian: Слонімская сінагога), is a former synagogue building in Slonim, Belarus. Completed in 1642, the Baroque-style building is a historical and cultural monument of the Republic of Belarus.

== History ==
The synagogue was the main religious building of Slonim's then numerous and influential Jewish community. The building was erected in 1642 and was initially part of the town's fortifications system.

In 1881 the synagogue was heavily damaged in a fire.

During the Second World War, almost the entire Jewish population of Slonim was murdered by the Nazis in the Holocaust. The building was left untouched by the German Luftwaffe during World War II, but has subsequently deteriorated. After the war, the Communist administration used the building as a furniture warehouse.

In 2001, after the restoration of the independence of Belarus, the building was returned to the Belarusian Jewish community.

== Planned restoration ==
The synagogue is standing but in a dilapidated condition. The Saving Heritage Foundation was established to help the with restoration of the synagogue. Under an initiative of the Kaplinsky family, a steering group for the conservation of the synagogue was established through the Foundation for Jewish Heritage to restore the Slonim Synagogue and to make it a “major educational facility, cross-cultural meeting place, memorial, place of worship, and a cultural centre ensuring that the Great Synagogue has a sustainable future”. The steering group included Britons and Americans with family links to the Jewish community of Slonim and the architect Tszwai So. In May 2021, the UK-based Foundation decided to cease its involvement, due to challenges with the five-year timeframe for redevelopment, political instability in Belarus, and the impact of the COVID-19 pandemic.

On 29 December 2020 the synagogue was sold at public auction to Ilona Karavaeva (known as Ilona Ioanna Reeves), a writer and musician, for approximately Belarusian ruble 27,400 (at that time $12,000). Interviewed in 2021, Reeves, a Christian, stated that she: "... planned to create a tourist site that will include a museum, a cultural center for meetings, lectures, concerts. My agreement clearly states that I am obliged to preserve the historical and cultural value of the building of the Jewish synagogue." However, by late 2023, Ilona Karavaeva, could not raise the funds required for the restoration due to political sanctions and war in Ukraine. Ilona Karavaeva had gifted the ownership of the building to local authorities, who again put the building up for sale.

== Gallery ==
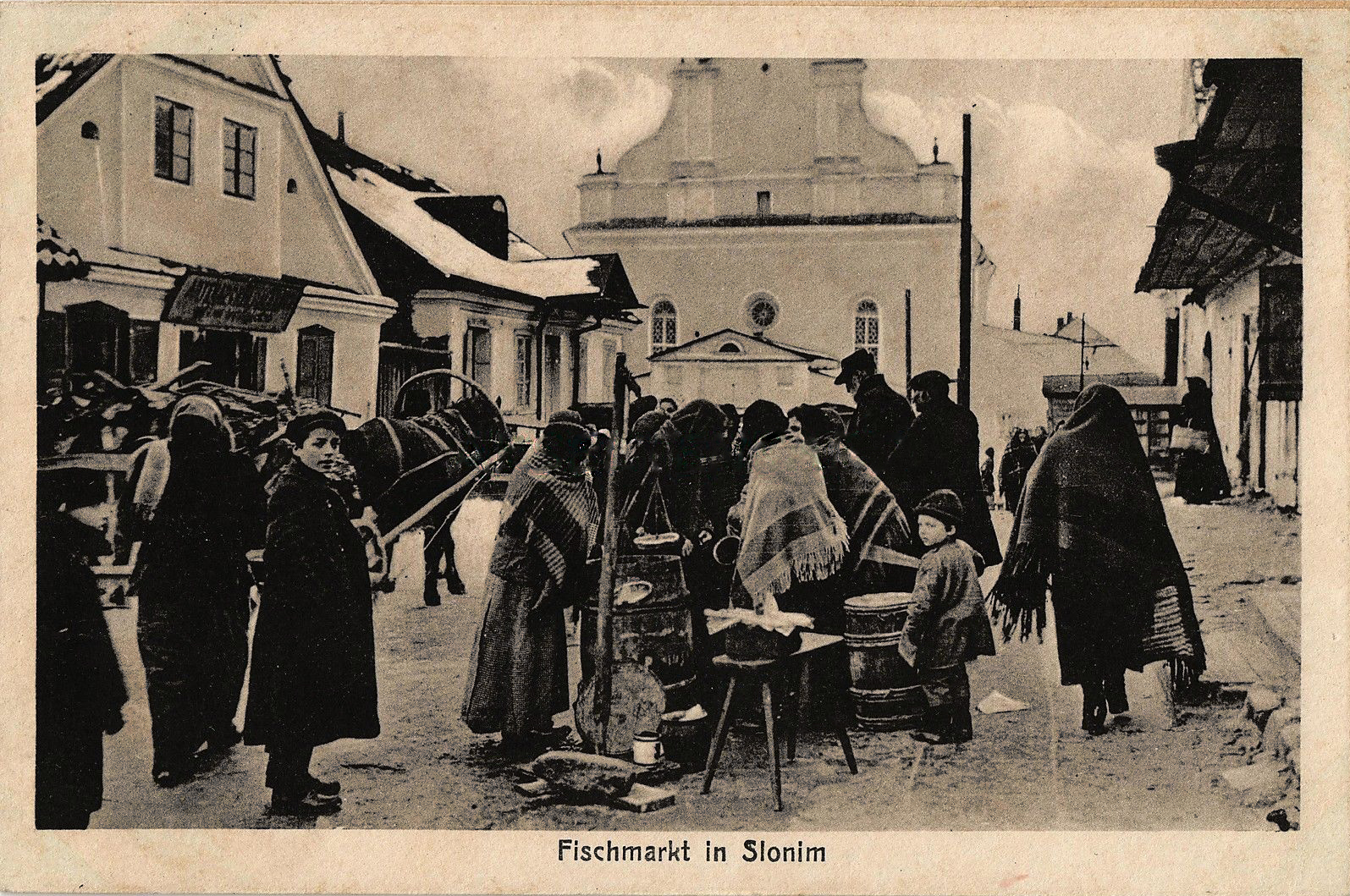
Fishmarket in front of the synagogue, 1906

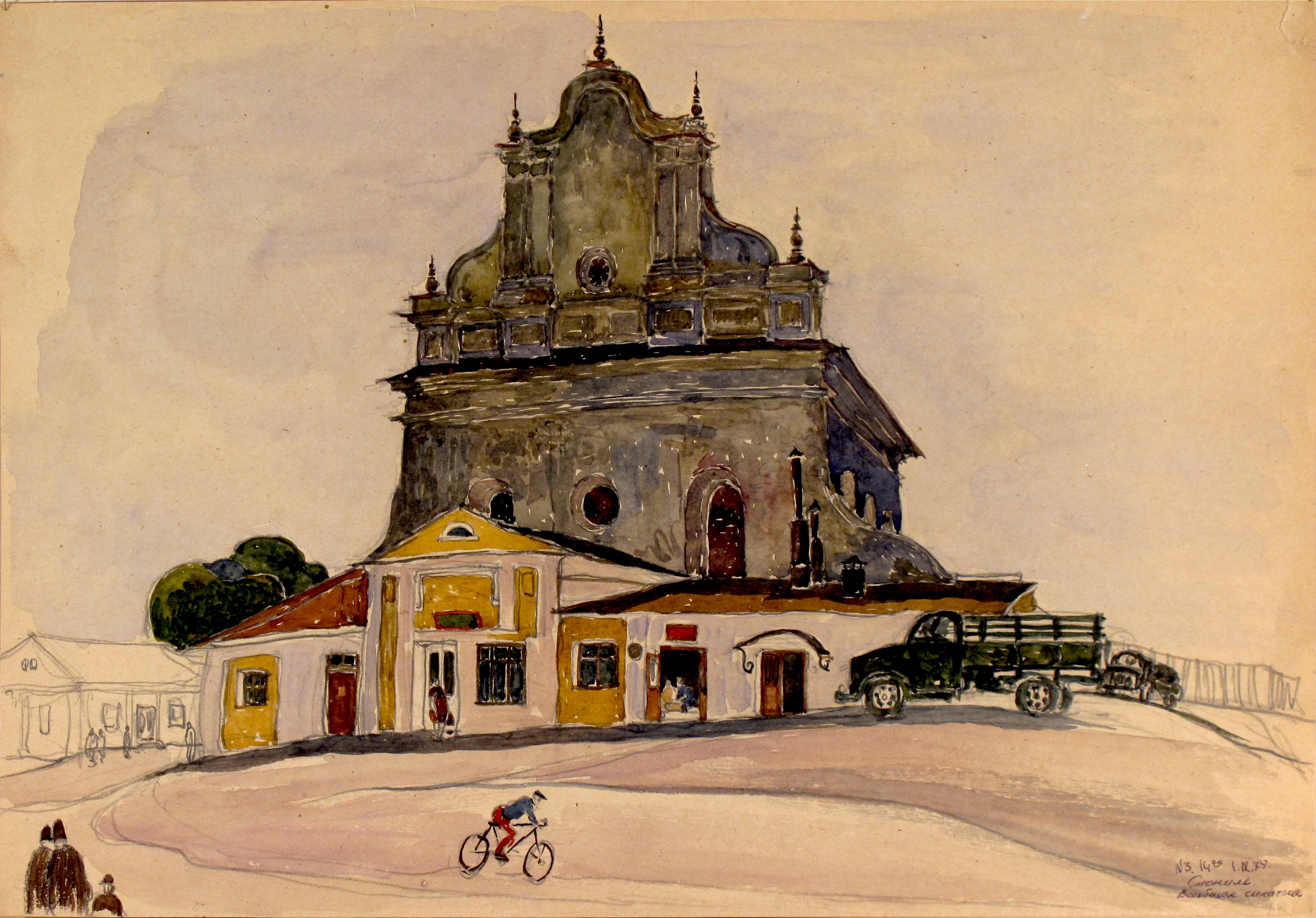
Slonim Synagogue, 1975 painting by Valery Sliunchanka

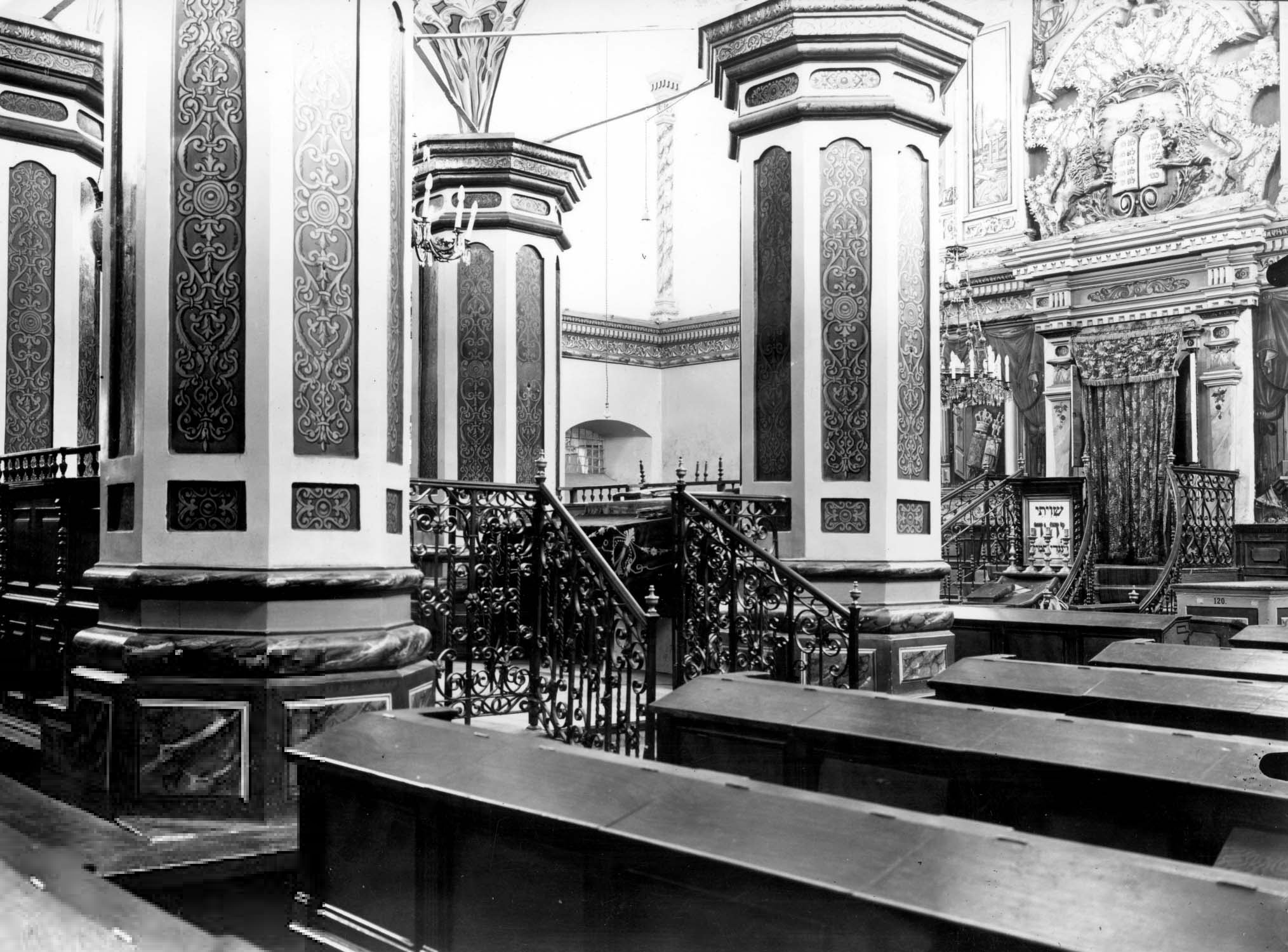
Interiors of the synagogue before 1939

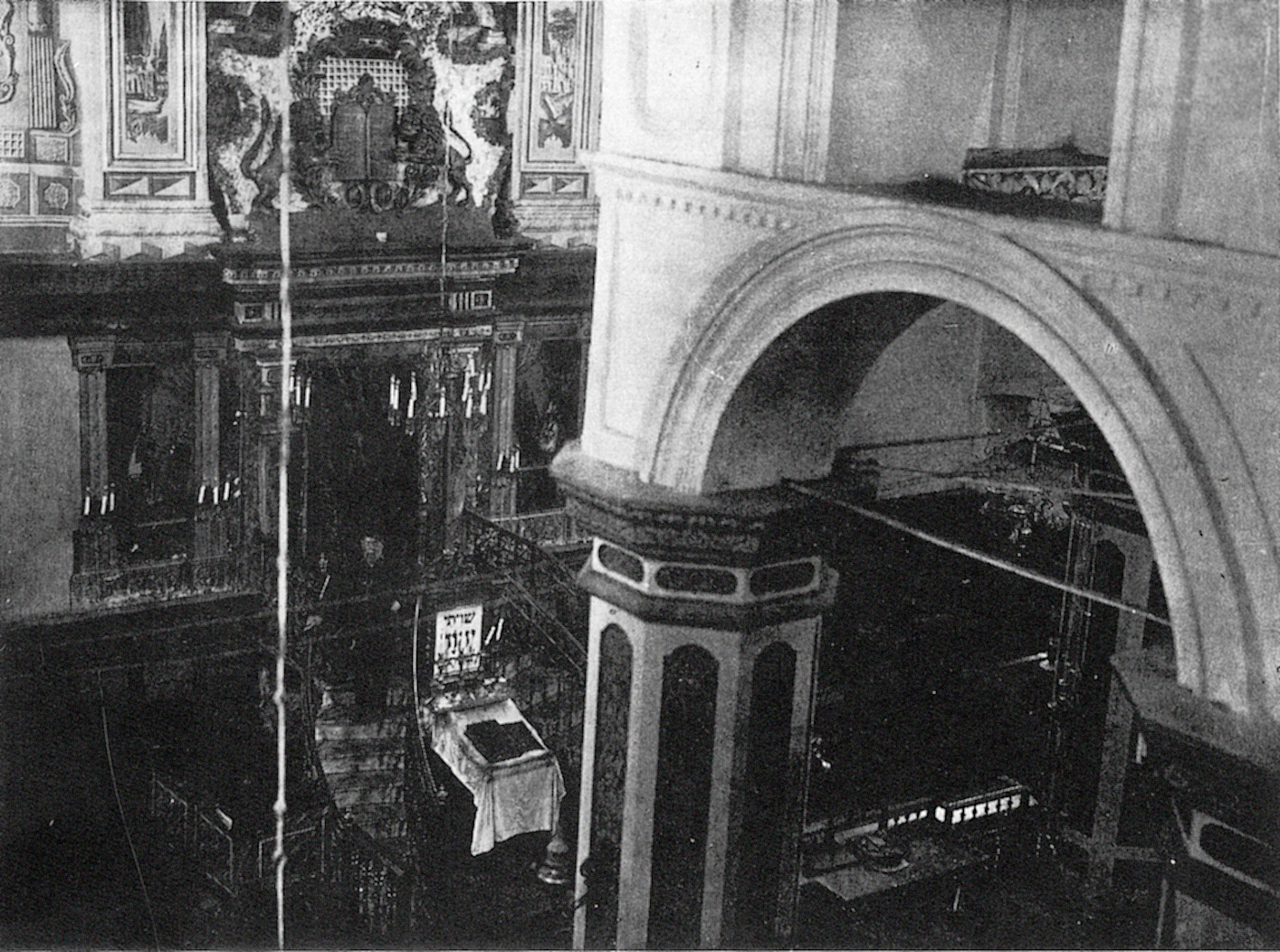
Interiors of the synagogue before 1939

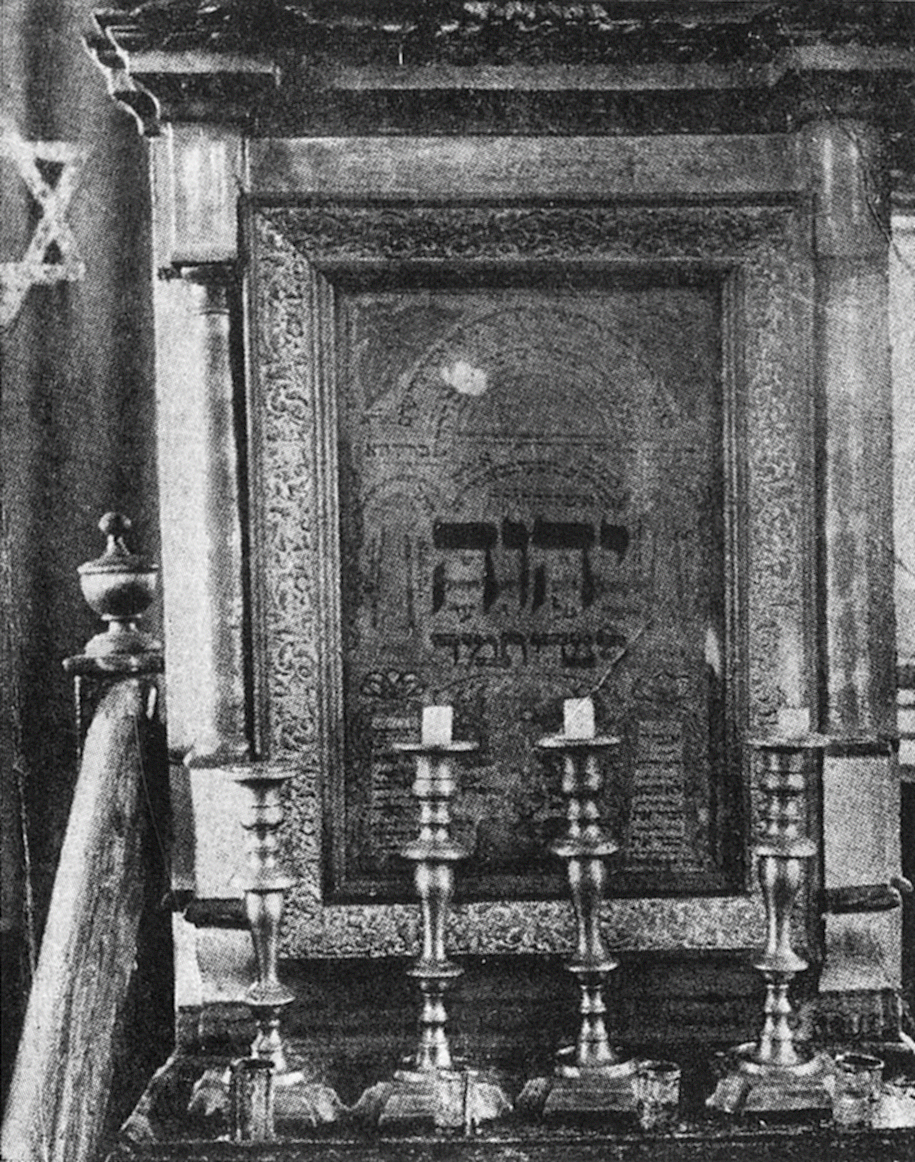
Interiors of the synagogue before 1939

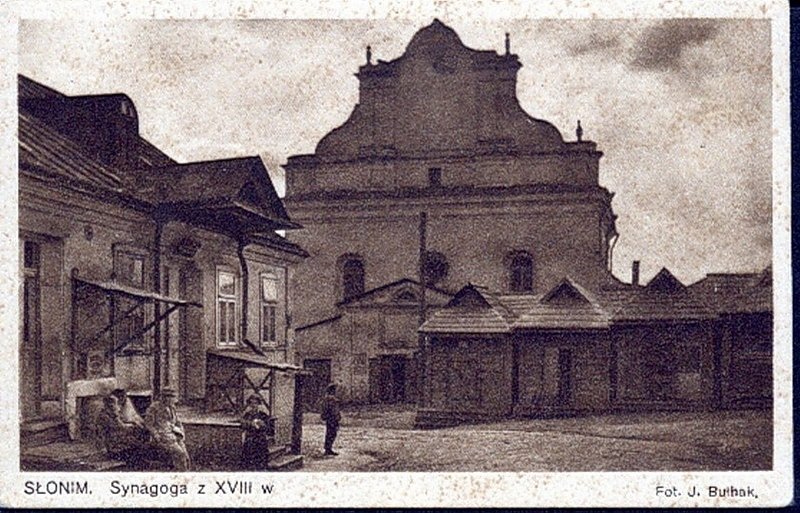
Slonim Synagogue, 1930 photo by the well-known Belarusian-Polish photographer, Jan Bulhak

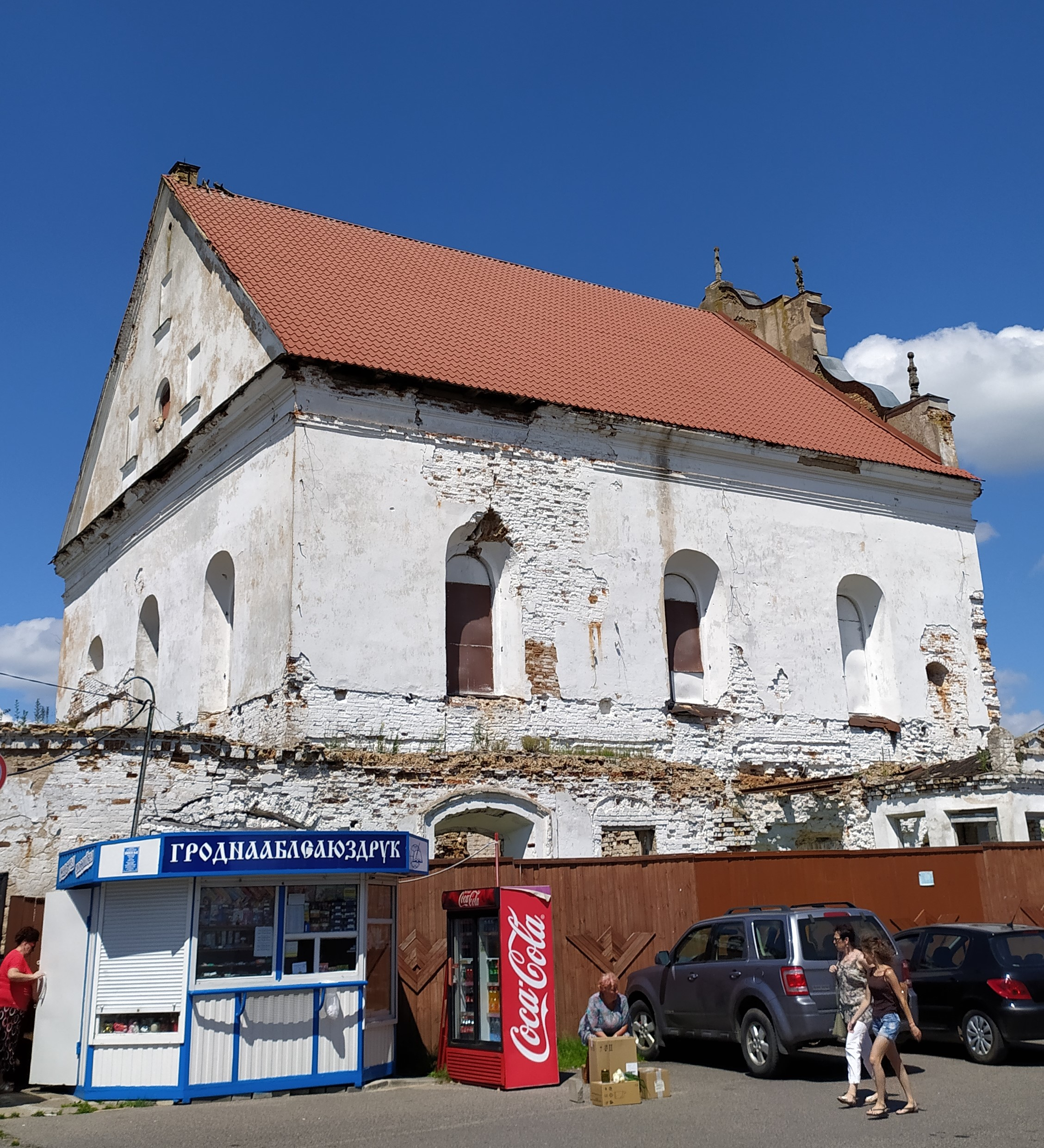
Slonim Synagogue in 2020

== See also ==
- Anshe Slonim Synagogue on the Lower East Side of Manhattan, New York
- Slonim (Hasidic dynasty)
