= The Blue (hotel) =

Hotel in Zhongshan, Taipei, Taiwan

The Blue by Just Inn 正旅館 藍
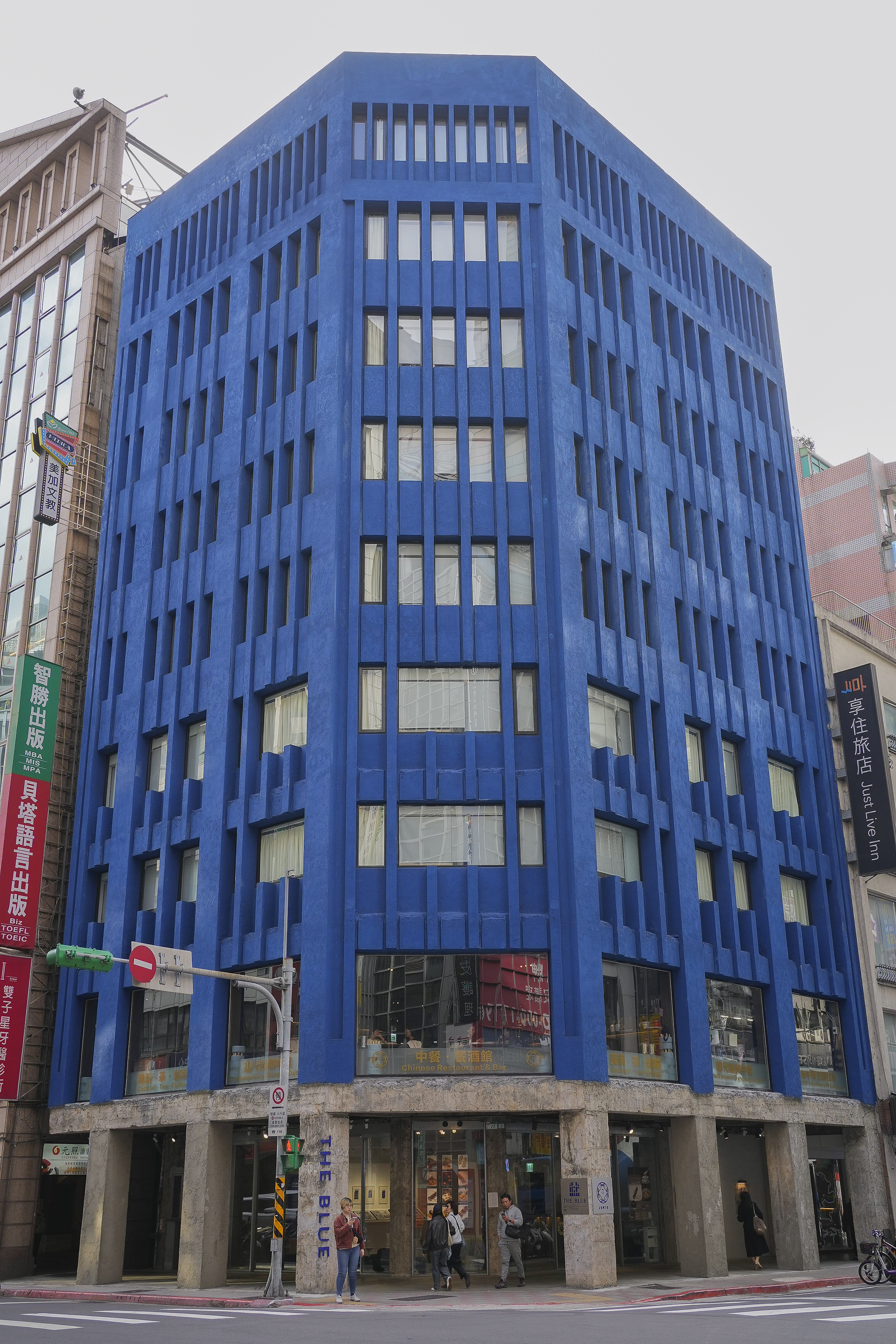
- Interactive map of the The Blue by Just Inn 正旅館 藍 area

General information
- Location: No. 22, Guanqian Rd, Zhonghsan, Taipei, taiwan
- Coordinates: 25.0450778°N 121.5142606°E
- Opening: January 2024
- Operator: Just Inn Group

Technical details
- Floor area: 2,020m2

Design and construction
- Architect: Tszwai So

Other information
- Number of rooms: 59
- Number of restaurants: 1

The Blue is a hotel in Taipei, Taiwan. It is the flagship hotel of the Taiwanese hotel group Just Inn.

== History ==
The building was originally constructed in the 1970s as an office of an insurance company. In the subsequent years, it operated as a mixed-use hotel with retail units on the ground and first floors.

The hotel was rebuilt in 2023 by the London-based architect Tszwai So, also known as the author of the award-winning Belarusian church in Finchley. It is described as an example of Emotionalist architecture, inspired by the Belarus-based UNOVIS artist movement of the early 20th century.

The hotel features 59 guestrooms, a restaurant, and a public art venue.

== Awards and shortlistings ==
In 2024, the renovated hotel was shortlisted in the Sustainable Renovation category of the Dezeen Award and in the Completed Buildings: Creative Re-use and Completed Buildings: Hotel and Leisure categories of the World Architecture Festival award.

In 2026, The Blue was conferred the 26th Taipei Architecture Renovation Award by the Taipei City Government.

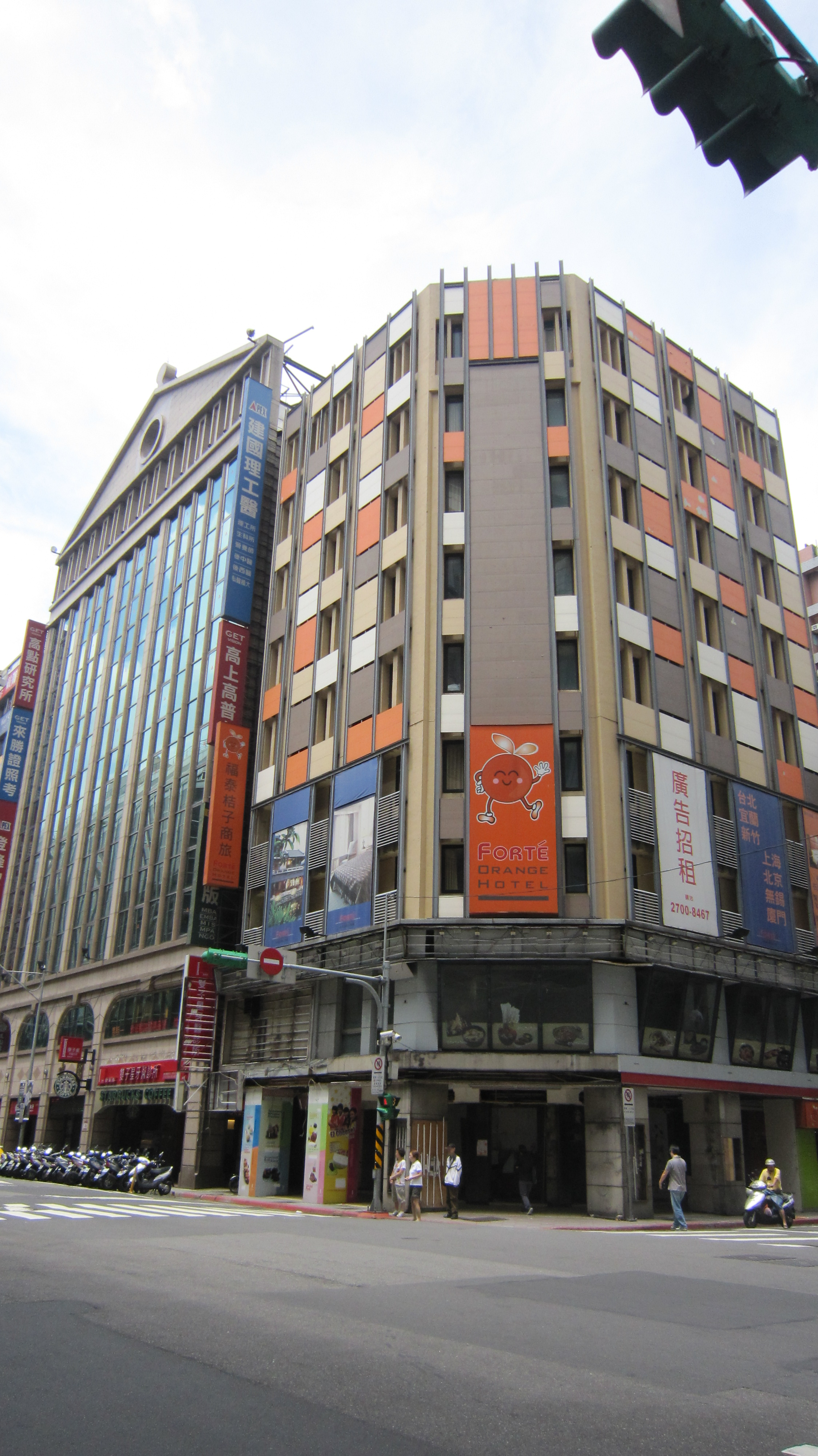
The building in 2012 before reconstruction

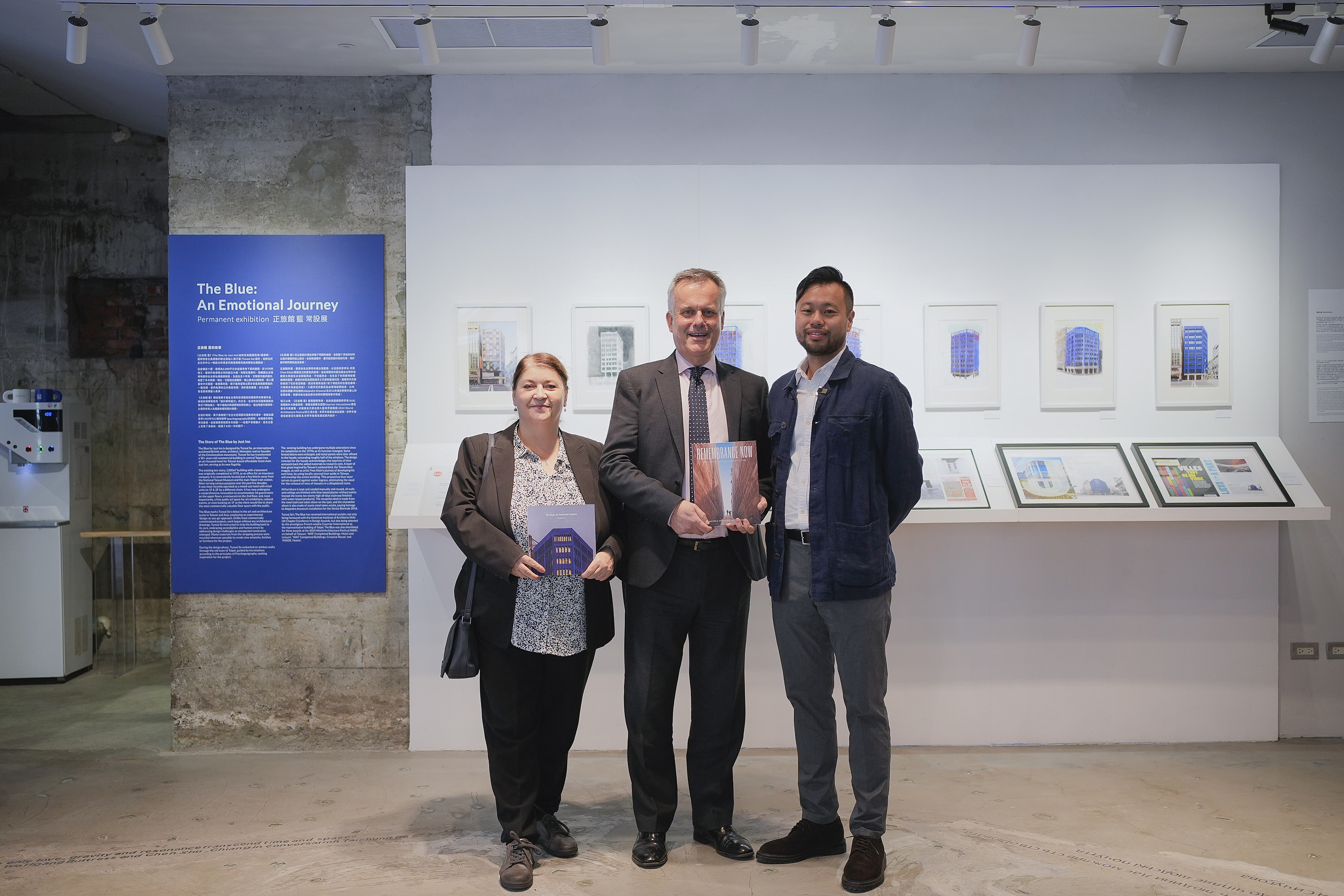
John Dennis, British Representative to Taiwan, and Tszwai So, architect, visiting The Blue in January 2025
