= Ganesh Kumar Bangah =

Malaysian entrepreneur

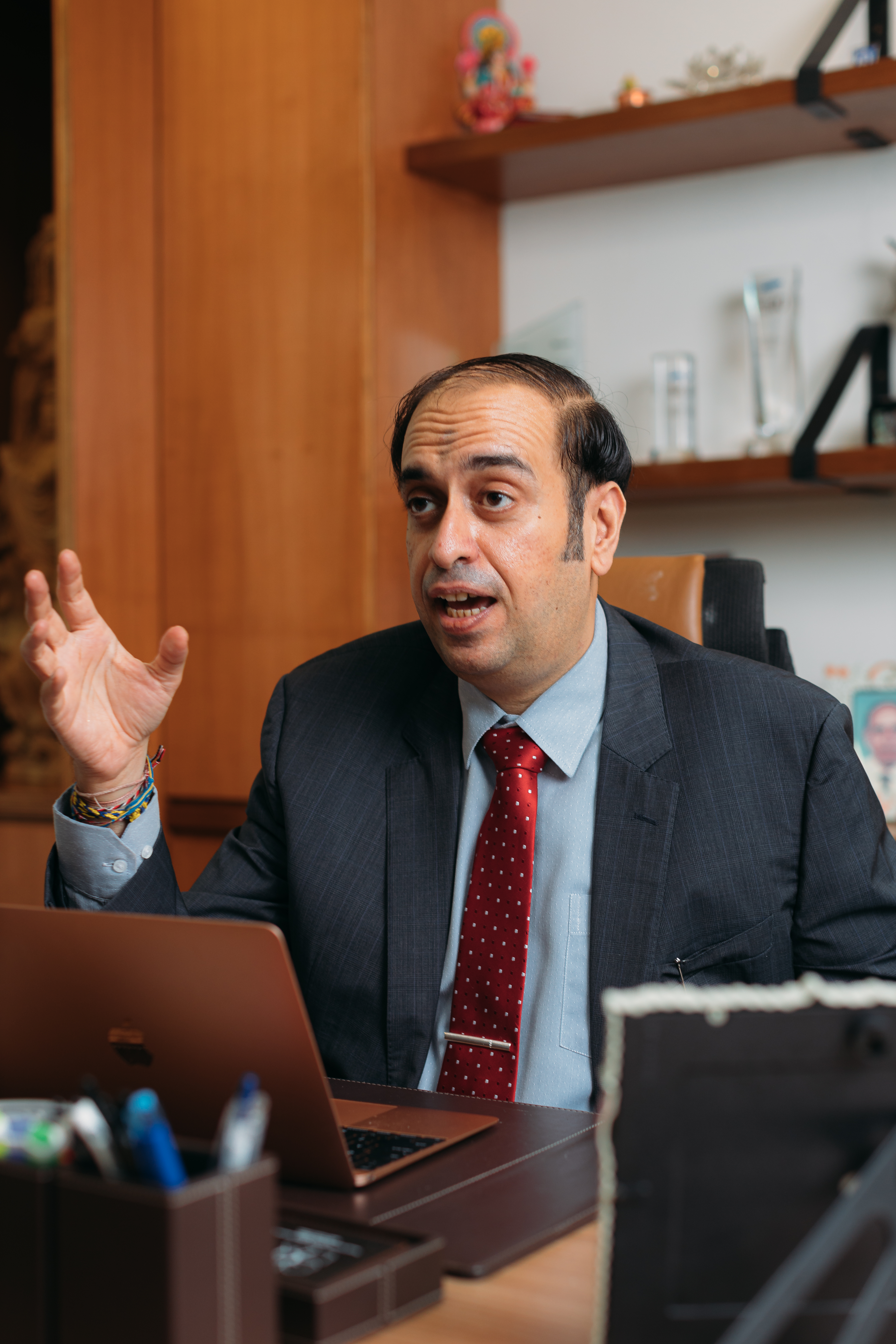
- Born: Ganesh Kumar Bangah; 18 August 1979 (age 47); Johor Bahru, Malaysia
- Education: Universiti Teknologi Malaysia (no degree)
- Occupation: Entrepreneur
- Known for: Founder of Commerce.Asia & MOL Global

Ganesh Kumar Bangah (born 18 August 1979) is a Malaysian serial entrepreneur, technology industry leader and startup investor. He is the founder of MOL Global and Commerce.Asia. He was named the Ernst & Young Technology Entrepreneur of the Year Malaysia in 2002 and at the age of 23, was certified by the Malaysia Book of Records as the youngest Chief Executive Officer of a Malaysian public listed company. He was recognized as one of Southeast Asia's Top 30 Tech Founders by Tech In Asia in 2016 and one of the Most Inspiring Malaysian Technology Entrepreneurs by Top 10 of Malaysia. Within the local tech community, he is also known as “Malaysia’s Bill Gates”, a fact affirmed by the Malaysia's oldest newspaper, the New Straits Times.

Ganesh founded his first internet business, MOL AccessPortal, in the year 2000 at the age of 20. The self-made technopreneur developed the business to become Southeast Asia's leading online payment gateway and Southeast Asia's first internet company to be listed on the National Association of Securities Dealers Automated Quotations System (NASDAQ) in 2014. He also founded the investment holding company, MOL Ventures, which made successful private investments in global social media and mobile internet companies such as Facebook, Friendster and Kakao. In 2017, Ganesh founded Commerce.Asia, an eCommerce platform.

== Early life and education ==
Ganesh was born and raised in Johor Bahru, Malaysia, the youngest son of Om Prakash Bangah, a pharmacist at a government hospital, and Leela Wanti, a housewife. Ganesh had an interest in technology since he was a young child. In 1992, when he was 12 years old, his father bought him his first computer which cost RM 6,000 (approximately US$1,400). He quickly developed an interest in business and technology. He used to run a side-gig buying computer parts in Singapore to resell them in Johor Bahru at higher prices. A turning point came for Ganesh when Bill Gates visited Singapore and Ganesh was able to watch him on TV.Ganesh was quoted as saying, “I told my boss at the time, who later became my partner, that I would be the Bill Gates of Malaysia. Ganesh continued his tertiary education in Universiti Teknologi Malaysia to study Telecommunication Engineering. In his 3rd year of university, he took a 6-month break from university to pursue a business opportunity, intending to return after. He never returned as his business, MOL, started growing rapidly and required his full attention.
