= Southern University College =

Private university college in Johor, Malaysia

Coordinates: 1.533161°N 103.679852°E

- Kolej Universiti Selatan (Malay) 南方大学学院 (Chinese)
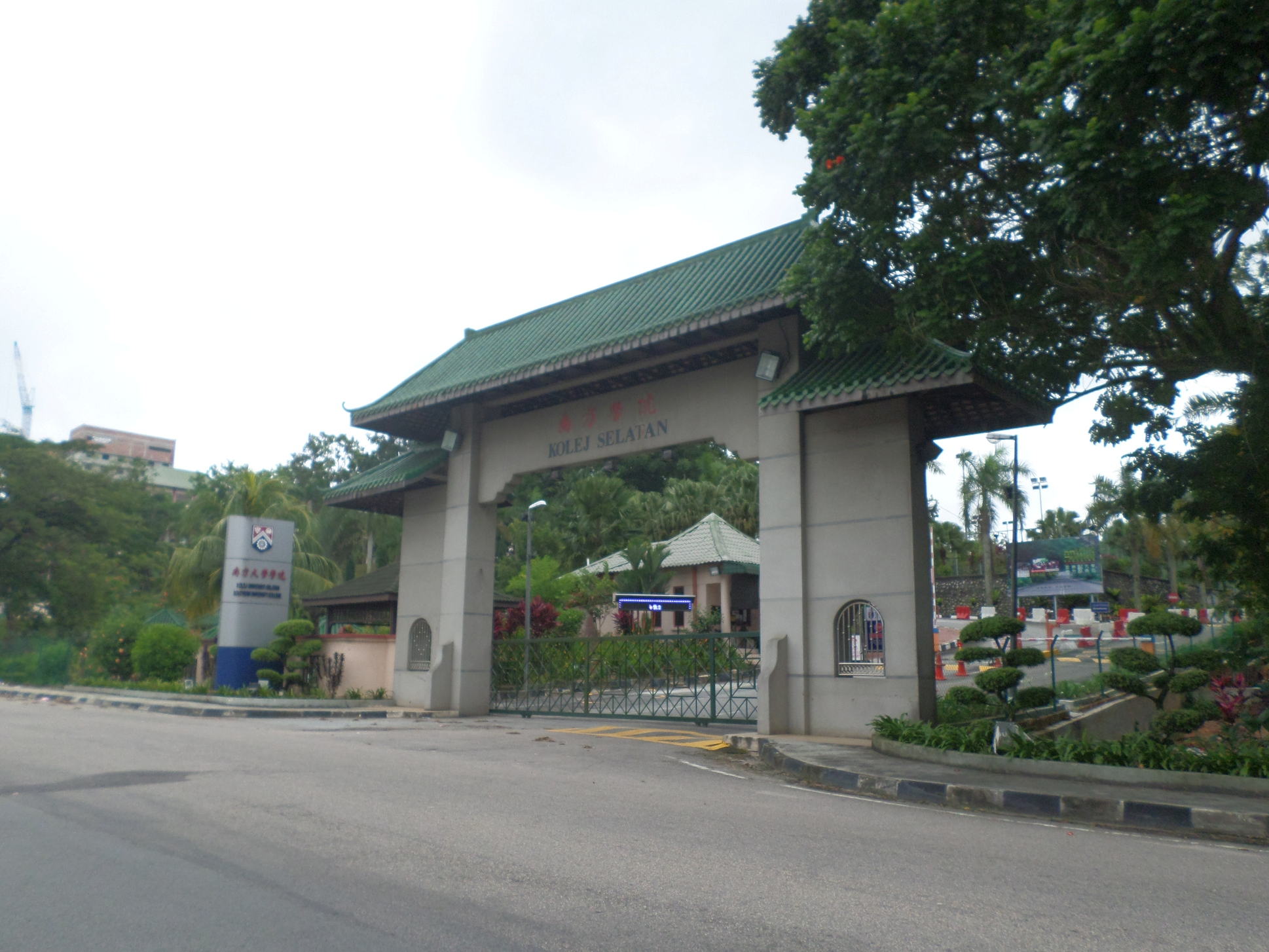
- Former names: Southern College (1990–2012)
- Motto: Self-Renewal, Virtue, Nature
- Type: Private
- Established: 1990
- Affiliations: MAPCU
- Location: Skudai, Johor, Malaysia
- Colours: Blue and Red
- Website: www.southern.edu.my

Southern University College
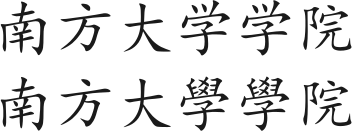
- Southern University College in Simplified Chinese (top) and Traditional Chinese character (below)
- Simplified Chinese: 南方大学学院
- Traditional Chinese: 南方大學學院
- Hanyu Pinyin: Nánfāng Dàxué Xuéyuàn
Transcriptions
Standard Mandarin
- Hanyu Pinyin: Nánfāng Dàxué Xuéyuàn

Southern University College (abbreviated as Southern UC) is a non-profit, private university college in Skudai, Johor, Malaysia. It is the first non-profit higher education institute and private university college in Skudai, Johor.

Southern UC have 6 faculties, 3 schools, 6 research institutes and 7 academic centres.

== History ==
The establishment of the Southern UC was to provide an education channel at home for high school graduates when they were unable to further studies in foreign countries.

Foon Yew Advanced Studies Programme was setting up in 1975, where later on the Foon Yew Board of Directors made application to the Ministry of Education for setting up Foon Yew College on the foundation of this programme. With the persistence and efforts of the Chinese community, Southern College was approved by the Ministry of Education and established in 1990. Through 22 years of management and efforts, the Ministry of Higher Education approved Southern College to upgrade to Southern University College on 19 June 2012.

== Campus ==
Southern University College is located in Skudai, Johor Bahru, Malaysia, which is in the Iskandar Malaysia Economic Zone. The campus is about 25 acres, donated by the philanthropist Seow Wan Heong. Following the development of Iskandar Malaysia Economic Zone, Southern UC will be one of the significant educational institutes of Malaysia and slowly develop as an international educational institute.

== Faculties ==
Location of Southern University College
- Faculty of Business & Management
  - Department of Accounting & Finance
  - Department of Marketing
  - Department of Management
  - Department of Tourism Management
  - Department of Postgraduate and Quality Assurance
- Faculty of Engineering & Information Technology
  - Department of Computer Science
  - Department of Electrical & Electronics Engineering
- Faculty of Humanities & Social Sciences
  - Department of Chinese
  - Department of English
  - Department of Malay
  - Department of Journalism and Communication
- Faculty of Art & Design
  - Department of Industrial Design
  - Department of Visual Communication
  - Department of Art
- Faculty of Chinese Medicine
  - Department of Chinese Medicine
- Faculty of Education and Psychology
  - Department of Education
- Southern Institute of Technical Education (SITE)

== Rankings and awards ==
Southern University College was awarded 4-star (Very good) rating for the overall college-based category in MyQUEST 2010/2011.
