= Mikhalova (Minsk Metro) =

Minsk Metro station

Coordinates: 53°52′36″N 27°29′49″E

Mikhalova Міхалова
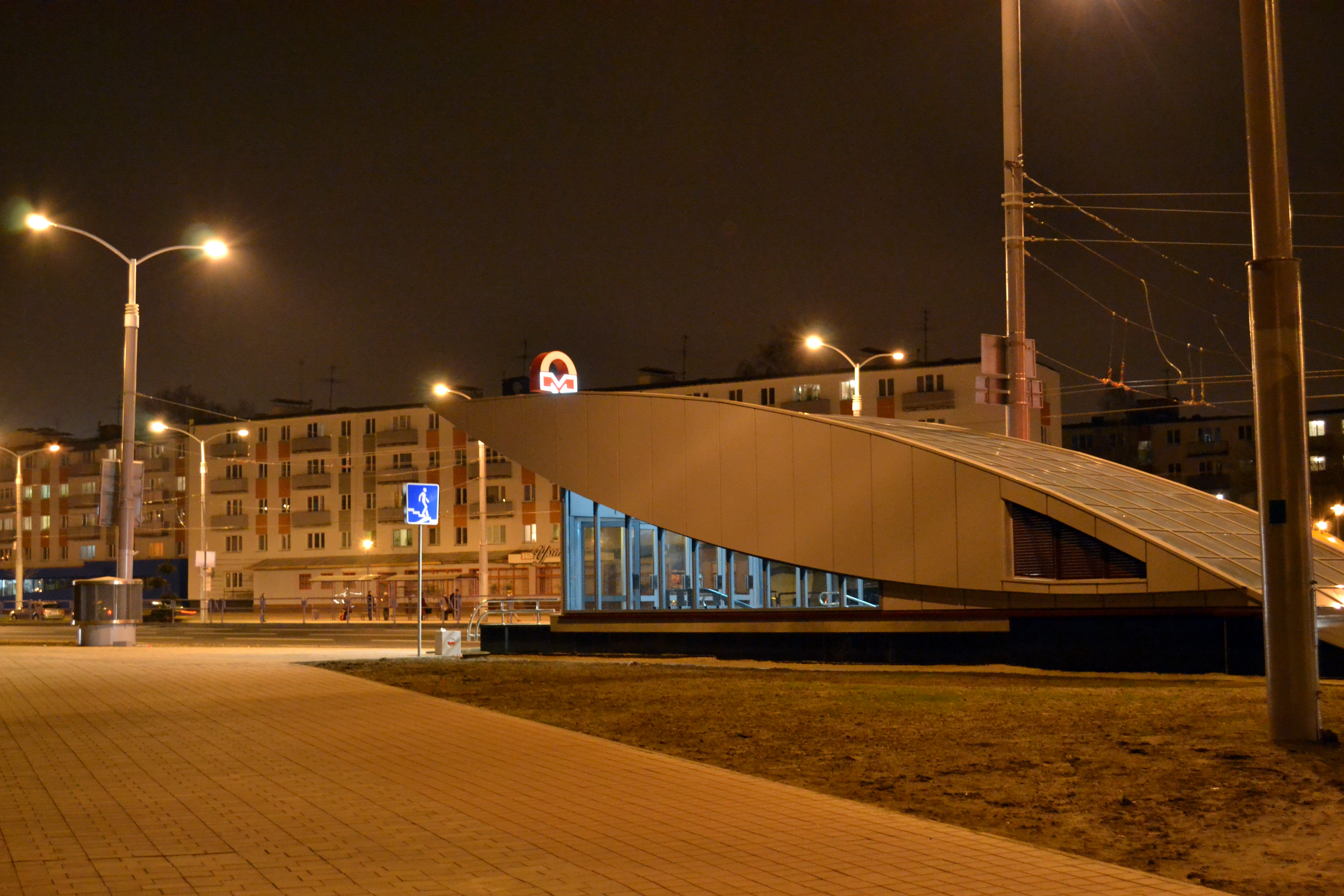

General information
- System: Minsk Metro
- Owner: Minsk Metro
- Line: Maskoŭskaja line
- Platforms: 1 island platform
- Tracks: 2

Construction
- Structure type: Underground

Other information
- Station code: 112

History
- Opened: 7 November 2012; 13 years ago

Services
Preceding station	Minsk Metro	Following station
Hrushawka towards Uručča	Maskoŭskaja line	Pyatrowshchyna towards Malinawka
Location
- Location within Belarus

Mikhalova (Belarusian: Міхалова; Russian: Михалово) is a Minsk Metro station. It was opened on 7 November 2012, along with the metro stations of Hrushawka and Pyatrowshchyna.

== Gallery ==
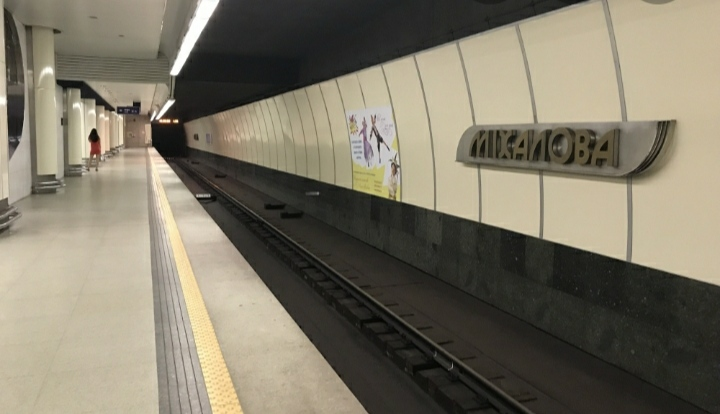
