= Hrushawka (Minsk Metro) =

Minsk Metro station

Coordinates: 53°53′12″N 27°30′53″E

Hrushawka Грушаўка
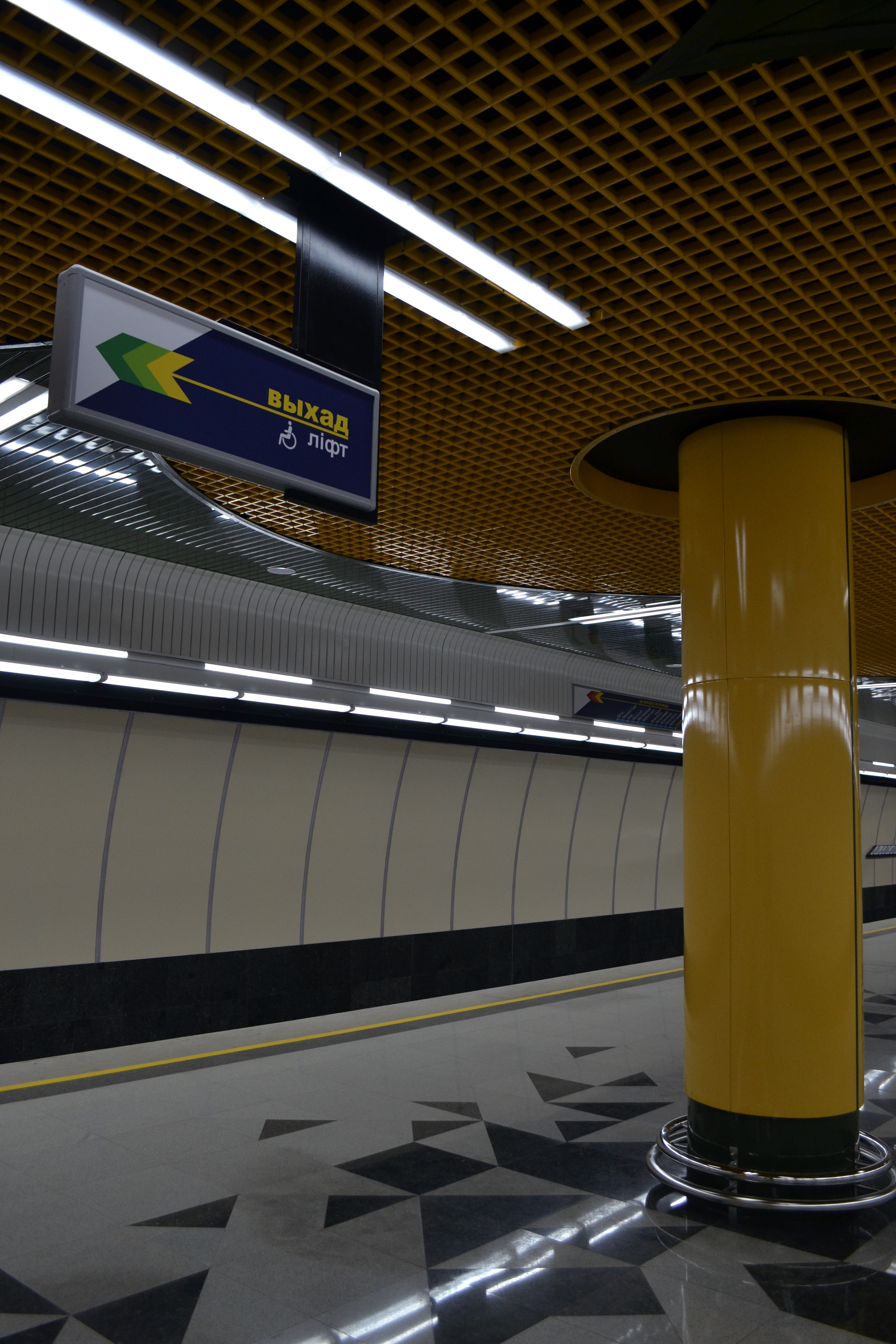

General information
- System: Minsk Metro
- Owner: Minsk Metro
- Line: Maskoŭskaja line
- Platforms: 1 island platform
- Tracks: 2

Construction
- Structure type: Underground

Other information
- Station code: 113

History
- Opened: 7 November 2012; 13 years ago

Services
Preceding station	Minsk Metro	Following station
Instytut Kultury towards Uručča	Maskoŭskaja line	Mikhalova towards Malinawka
Location
- Location within Belarus

Hrushawka (Belarusian: Грушаўка; Russian: Грушевка) is a Minsk Metro station. It was opened on 7 November 2012, along with the metro stations of Mikhalova and Pyatrowshchyna.

== Gallery ==
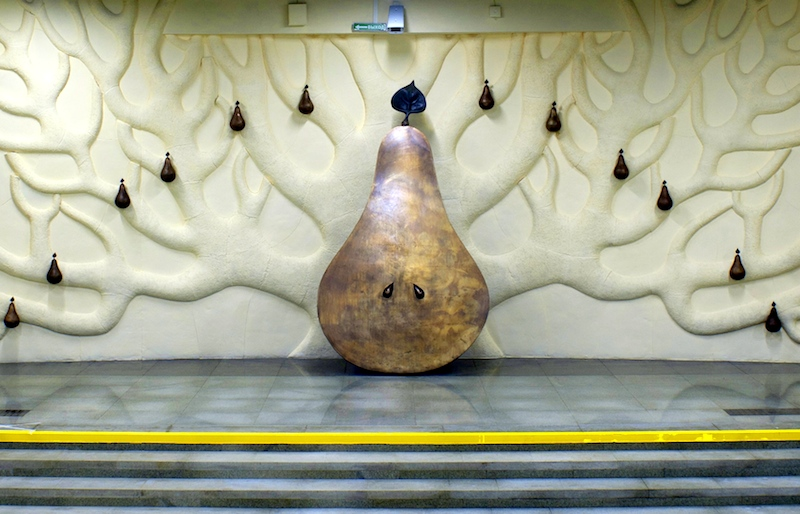
Hrushawka, 2012, bronze, ceramics (author Maxim Piatrul)
