= Pyatrowshchyna (Minsk Metro) =

Minsk Metro station

Coordinates: 53°51′53″N 27°29′10″E

Pyatrowshchyna Пятроўшчына
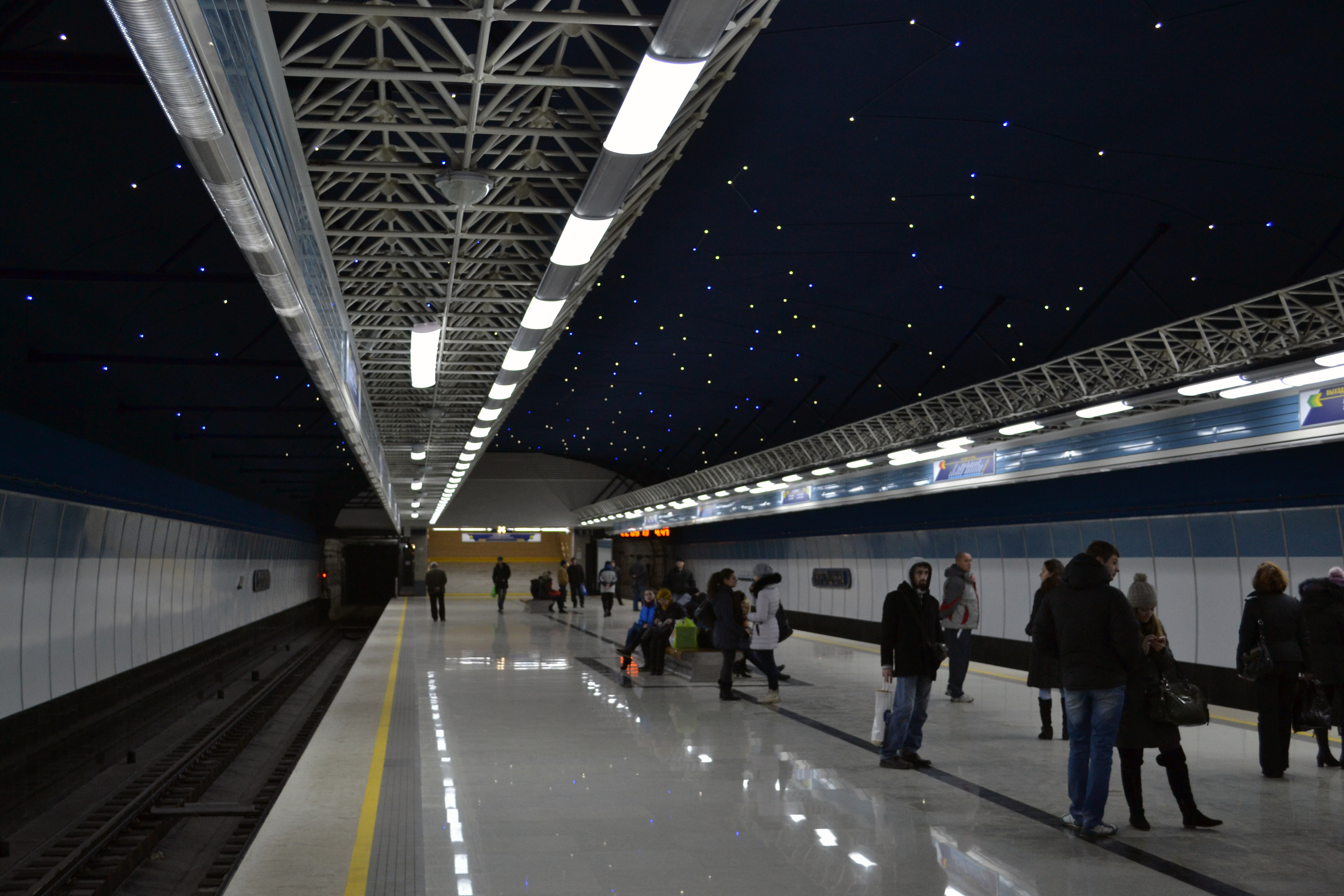
- Пятроўшчына (Piatroŭščyna)

General information
- Location: 290
- System: Minsk Metro
- Owner: Minsk Metro
- Line: Maskoŭskaja line
- Platforms: 1 island platform
- Tracks: 2

Construction
- Structure type: Underground

Other information
- Station code: 111

History
- Opened: 7 November 2012; 14 years ago

Services
Preceding station	Minsk Metro	Following station
Mikhalova towards Uručča	Maskoŭskaja line	Malinawka Terminus
Location
- Location within Belarus

Pyatrowshchyna (Belarusian: Пятроўшчына, romanized: Piatroŭščyna; Russian: Петровщина, romanized: Pyetrovshchina) is a Minsk Metro station. It was opened on 7 November 2012, along with the metro stations of Hrushawka and Mikhalova.

== Gallery ==
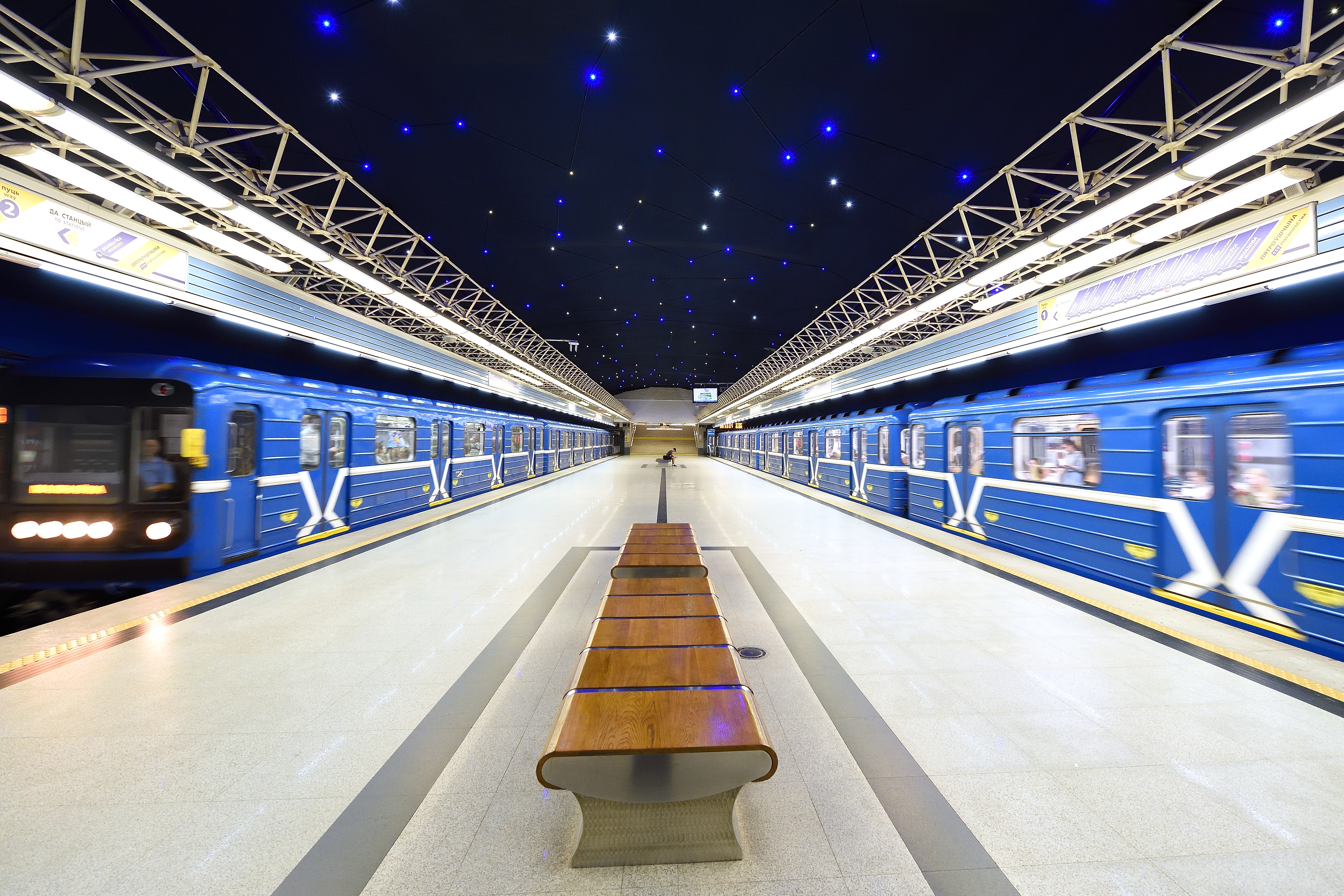

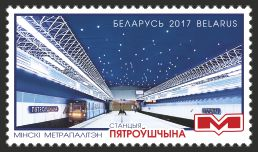
