= Maskoŭskaja line =

Minsk Metro line

Maskoŭskaya line
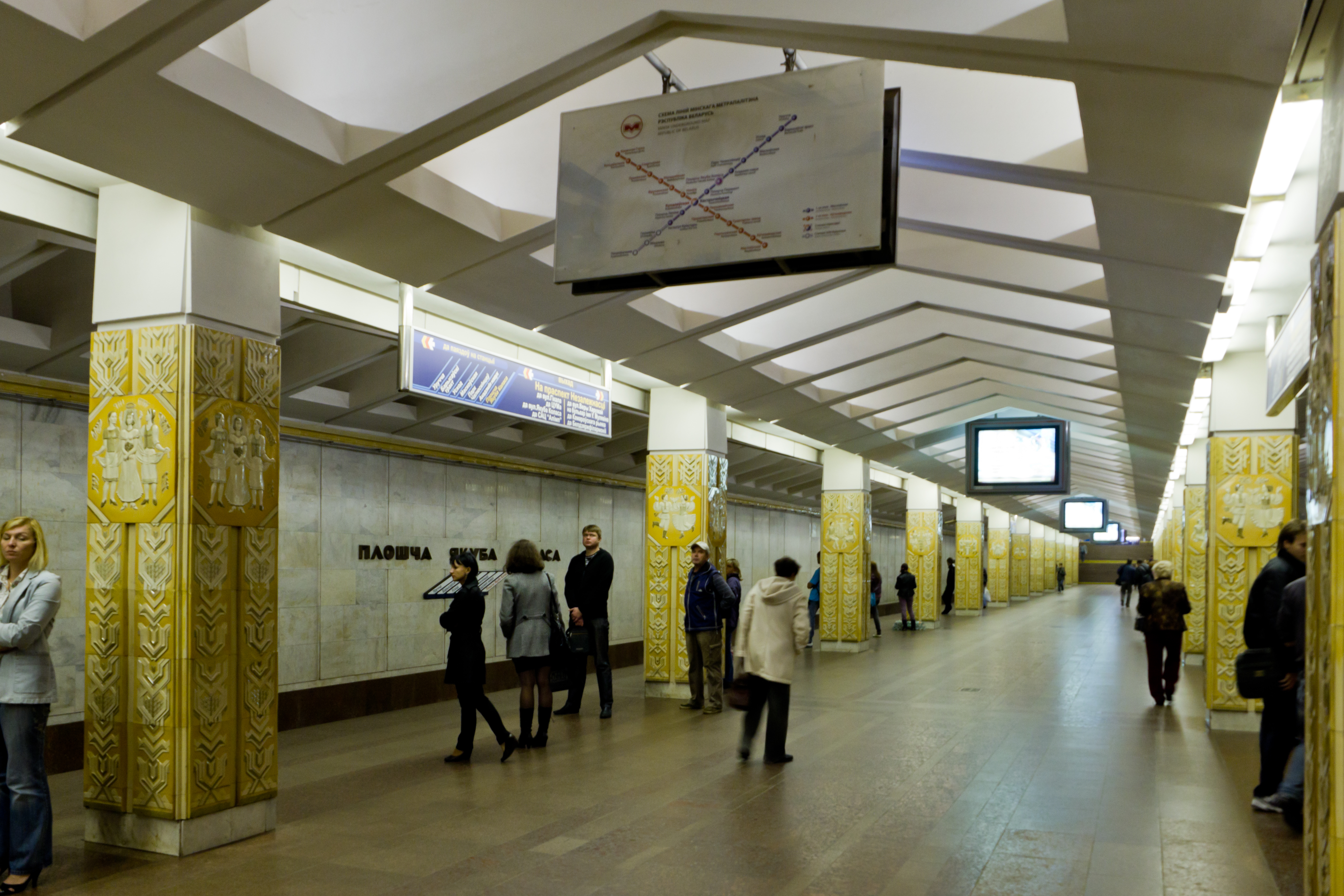
- Ploshcha Yakuba Kolasa station

Overview
- Status: Operational
- Owner: Minsk Metro
- Termini: Uručča; Malinawka
- Stations: 15

Service
- Type: Rapid transit
- System: Minsk Metro

History
- Opened: 1984

Technical
- Line length: 19.1 km (11.9 mi)
- Track gauge: 1,524 mm (5 ft)
Route map

The Maskoŭskaja line (also referred to as Maskowskaya line or Moskovskaya line) (Belarusian: Маскоўская лінія; Russian: Московская линия, romanized: Moskovskaya liniya; lit: "Moscow line") is a line of the Minsk Metro that serves Minsk, the capital of Belarus. The line was opened along with the Metro in 1984 with the original eight station segment, and crosses the city on a northeast–southwest axis. Currently, it comprises 15 stations and 19.1 km (11.9 mi) of track.

== Timeline ==
Segment	Date opened
Instytut Kultury–Maskowskaya	26 June 1984
Maskoŭskaja–Uschod	30 December 1986
Uschod–Uručča	7 November 2007
Instytut Kultury–Pyatrowshchyna	7 November 2012
Pyatrowshchyna–Malinawka	3 June 2014

== Transfers ==
#	Transfer to	At
2	Awtazavodskaya line	Kastrychnitskaya
3	Zelenaluzhskaya line	Ploshcha Lyenina

== Rolling stock ==
The line is served by the Moskovskoe depot (№ 1), and currently has 21 five carriage 81-717/714 and the modernised 81-717.5M/714.5M trains assigned to it.

== Recent developments and future plans ==
A 5.2 km extension has been constructed to the southwest of the city and contains three stations: Hrushawka, Mikhalova, and Pyatrowshchyna. It was opened on 7 November 2012.

The last extension was on 3 June 2014, when Malinawka was opened.
