= Minsk Metro =

Rapid transit railway in Minsk, Belarus

Coordinates: 53°53′41″N 27°32′54″E

Overview
- Native name: Мінскі метрапалітэн; Minski mietrapaliten; Минский метрополитен; Minskiy metropoliten
- Owner: Government of the Byelorussian SSR (1984–1991); Government of the Republic of Belarus (1991–present)
- Locale: Minsk, Belarus
- Transit type: Rapid transit
- Number of lines: 3 (1 planned)
- Number of stations: 36
- Daily ridership: 684 000 (2024) ▲
- Annual ridership: 250.37 million (2024) ▲
- Website: metropoliten.by

Operation
- Began operation: 29 June 1984; 42 years ago
- Operators: Мінскі метрапалітэн (Minsk Metro)
- Number of vehicles: 390

Technical
- System length: 44.89 km (27.9 mi)
- Track gauge: 1,520 mm (4 ft 11 27/32 in)
- Electrification: 825V DC conductor (substation output, in rail 750V on average)
- Average speed: 40.7 km/h (25 mph)
- Top speed: 80 km/h

Construction of Minsk metro

The Minsk Metro (Belarusian: Мінскі метрапалітэн, romanized: Minski mietrapaliten; Russian: Минский метрополитен) is a rapid transit system that serves Minsk, the capital of Belarus. The construction of the metro in Minsk began in 1977. Opened on 29 June 1984, it presently consists of 3 lines and 36 stations, totaling 44.89 kilometres (27.89 mi). In 2013, the system carried 328.3 million passengers, for an average daily ridership of 899,450. In 2023, the system carried 233.9 million passengers, which averages to a daily ridership of 640,800. The Minsk metro was the ninth metro system built in the USSR.

== History ==
During the 1950s–1970s the population of the city grew past the one million mark and designs for a rapid transit system were initially proposed during the late-1960s. Construction of the Minsk Metro began on 3 May 1977, and the system was opened to the public on 30 June 1984, becoming the ninth metro system in the Soviet Union. The original eight station section has since expanded into a three-line 36 station network with a total of 44.89 kilometres (27.89 mi) of route.

Despite the dissolution of the Soviet Union, the construction of the Minsk metro continued uninterrupted throughout the 1990s (as opposed to other ex-Soviet Metros like those of Yerevan and Samara, which ceased due to a complete lack of funding). Some experts attribute it to the slow reform of the Soviet-planned economy in Belarus, which turned out to be beneficial for metro expansion. For example, the final phase of the Aŭtazavodskaja Line, originally planned for 2006, was opened in late-2005, and similarly the northern extension of the Maskoŭskaja Line, originally scheduled for 2008, opened on 7 November 2007. In November 2012, three new stations opened on the southern end of the Maskoŭskaja line (Instytut Kultury - Piatroŭščyna) and in June 2014 the line was expanded in the south part with 1 more new station (Piatroŭščyna - Malinaŭka).

Construction of the first phase of the new Line 3 (Zyelyenaluzhskaya Line) started in 2014 which consisted of 4 new stations running from Yubileynaya ploshcha to Kavalskaya Slabada station. The first phase opened on 6 November 2020. The second phase started construction in 2018 and opened on 30 December 2024, which contains the extension from Kavaĺskaja Slabada to Slutski Hastsinets stations with one depot being built in the new south terminal station of the line.

In 2016, the Minsk Metro placed an order with Stadler Rail for 10 units containing six four-car and four five-car trainsets that will replace older rolling stock. These Stadler M110/M111 trains entered service in February 2020.

=== Timeline ===
Segment	Line	Date opened
Instytut Kultury–Maskoŭskaja	Maskowskaya	30 June 1984
Maskoŭskaja–Uschod	Maskowskaya	30 December 1986
Traktarny zavod–Frunzenskaya	Awtazavodskaya	31 December 1990
Pieršamajskaja	Awtazavodskaya	28 May 1991
Frunzenskaya–Puškinskaja	Awtazavodskaya	3 July 1995
Traktarny zavod–Avtazavodskaya	Awtazavodskaya	7 November 1997
Avtazavodskaya–Mogilevskaya	Awtazavodskaya	5 September 2001
Puškinskaja–Kamyennaya Horka	Awtazavodskaya	7 November 2005
Uschod–Uručča	Maskowskaya	7 November 2007
Instytut Kultury –Piatroŭščyna	Maskowskaya	7 November 2012
Piatroŭščyna–Malinaŭka	Maskowskaya	3 June 2014
Jubiliejnaja plošča–Kavaĺskaja Slabada	Zyelyenaluzhskaya	6 November 2020
Kavaĺskaja Slabada–Slutski Hastsinets	Zyelyenaluzhskaya	30 December 2024

== Operational characteristics ==
The city is located on an almost level surface and on very dry soil. As a result, although all of the Minsk Metro stations are under the surface, there are no deep-level stations that are found in most of the ex-Soviet cities. Out of the current 36 stations 25 are pillar-spans and 11 are of vaulted type. Like most of the Soviet metro systems, all of the stations are vividly decorated. Some (notably, Ploshcha Yakuba Kolasa) exhibit Belarusian national motifs, while others focus on more Soviet socialist themes, although recent years have seen more priority on high-tech decorations.

Signs and announcements in the metro system are in Belarusian and English.

== Expansion plans ==
A map of the future system of Minsk Metro with all the proposed and planned extensions

Construction of a third line, the Zyelyenaluzhskaya line (shown in green), began in 2014. When fully completed, this line will run from the south to the northeast of the city via the centre, creating two new transfer points with the existing lines.

The first stage of the line was opened on 7 November 2020, running from Jubiliejnaja Plošča to Kavaĺskaja S labada station. This follows a northern contour parallel to Maskowskaya which has since relieved the extensive congestion in the city area with 2 interchange stations at Vakzaĺnaja (Plošča Lienina station of Line 1) and Jubiliejnaja Plošča station (Frunzienskaja station of Line 2).

As of 2025, the Zyelyenaluzhskaya line consists of seven stations and is planned to be extended north to the residential area of Zyalyony Luh.

The planned fourth (Circle) line is expected to connect south and north parts of the city which are densely populated. This line is planned to have a length of 37 kilometres with 1 new depot serving the line and 17 new stations of which 6 stations are going to be interchange stations. Specifically, Line 4 will interchange at Michalova and Akademija navuk stations of Line 1, Traktarny zavod and Puškinskaja stations of Line 2 and future Plošča Banhalor and Aerodromnaja stations of Line 3.

Two extensions of Line 1 and two of Line 2 (4 in total) with 2 new stations for Line 1 and 2 respectively were mentioned but never went into additional consideration as the construction of Line 3 and the plans for Line 4 keep their priority low. These expansions were specifically mentioned as:

Line 1: Malinaŭka – Ščomyslica and Uručča – Smalienskaja

Line 2: Kamiennaja Horka – Krasny Bor and Mahilioŭskaja – Šabany

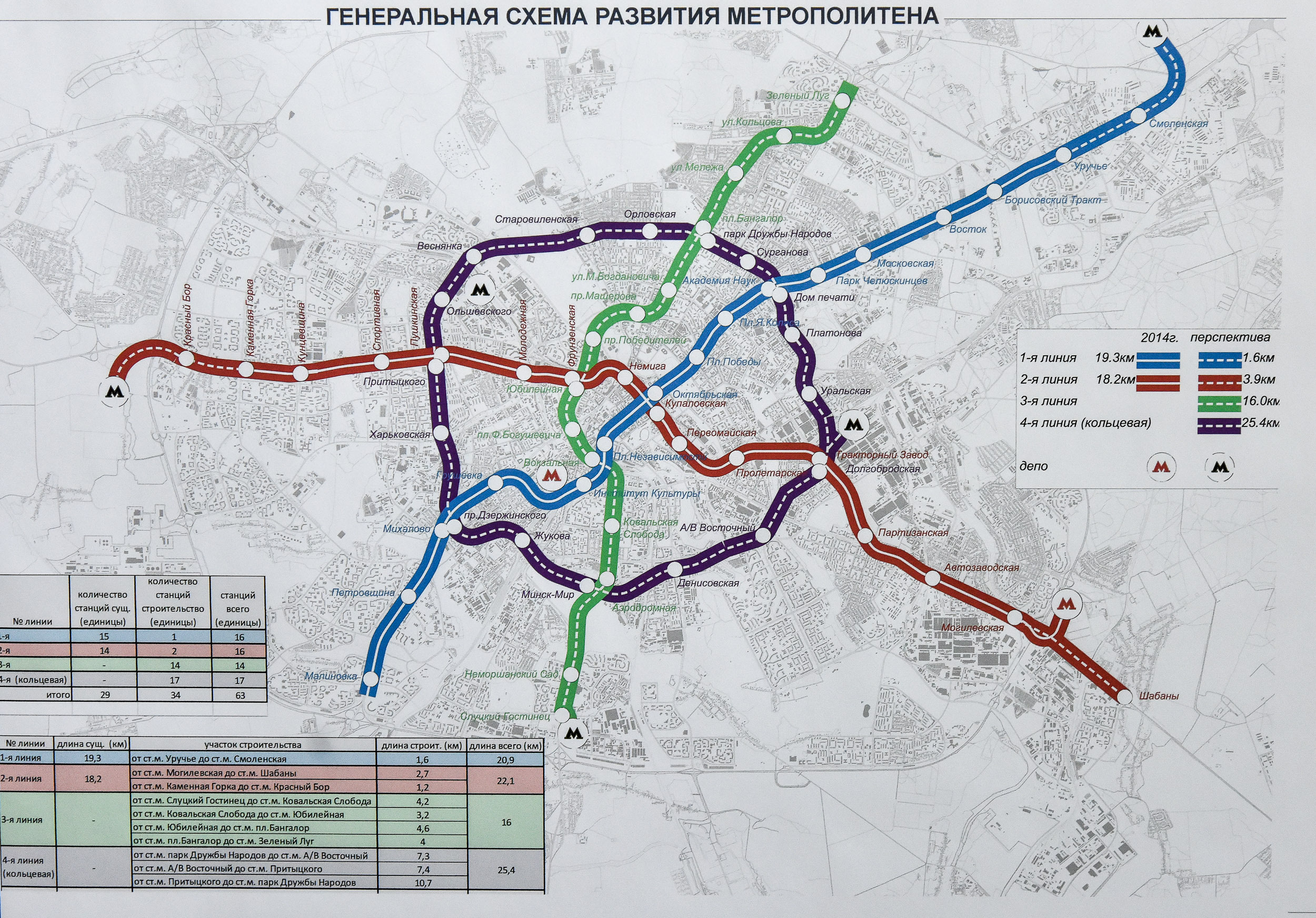
The official map with all the planned extensions of Minsk Metro not including the Malinawka-Shchomyslitsa extension

== Incidents ==
=== 1999 stampede ===
On 30 May 1999, a sudden thunderstorm caused a large crowd, from a nearby rock concert, to seek shelter at the Niamiha station. The limited size of the underpass leading into the ticket hall and the wet pavement caused a human crush. Fifty-three people died.

=== 2011 bombing ===
The Kastryčnickaja station was the site of a terrorist bombing on 11 April 2011. Fifteen people were killed.

== Lines and stations ==
#	Name (Belarusian (romanized) / Belarusian / Named after)	Opened	Length	Stations
1	Maskowskaya / Маскоўская / Moscow	1984	19.1 km	15
2	Awtazavodskaya / Аўтазаводская / Automobile Plant	1990	18.1 km	14
3	Zyelyenaluzhskaya / Зеленалужская / Zyalyony Luh	2020	7.6 km	7
	Total		44.8 km	36

== Gallery ==
=== Maskowskaya line ===
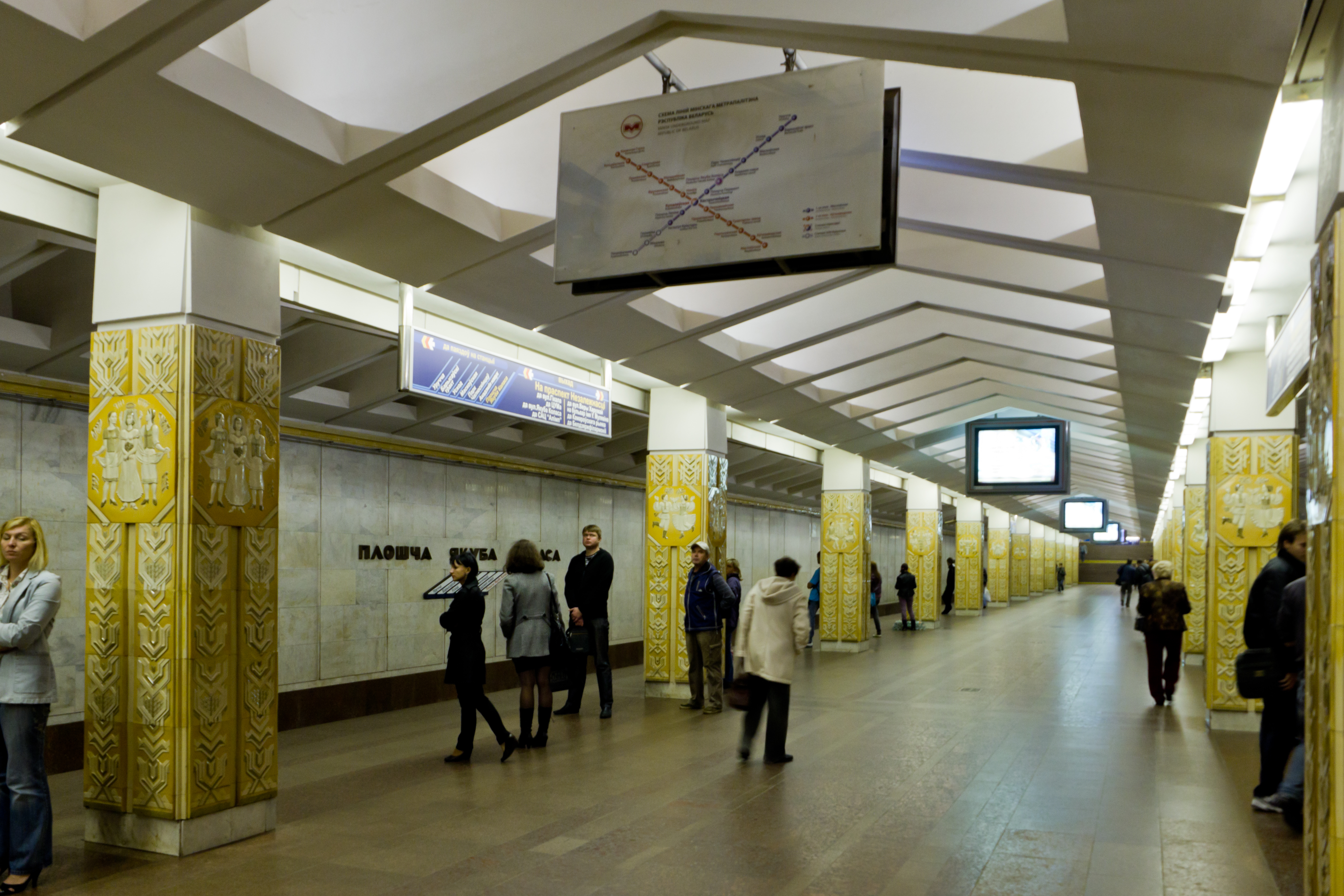
Ploshcha Yakuba Kolasa

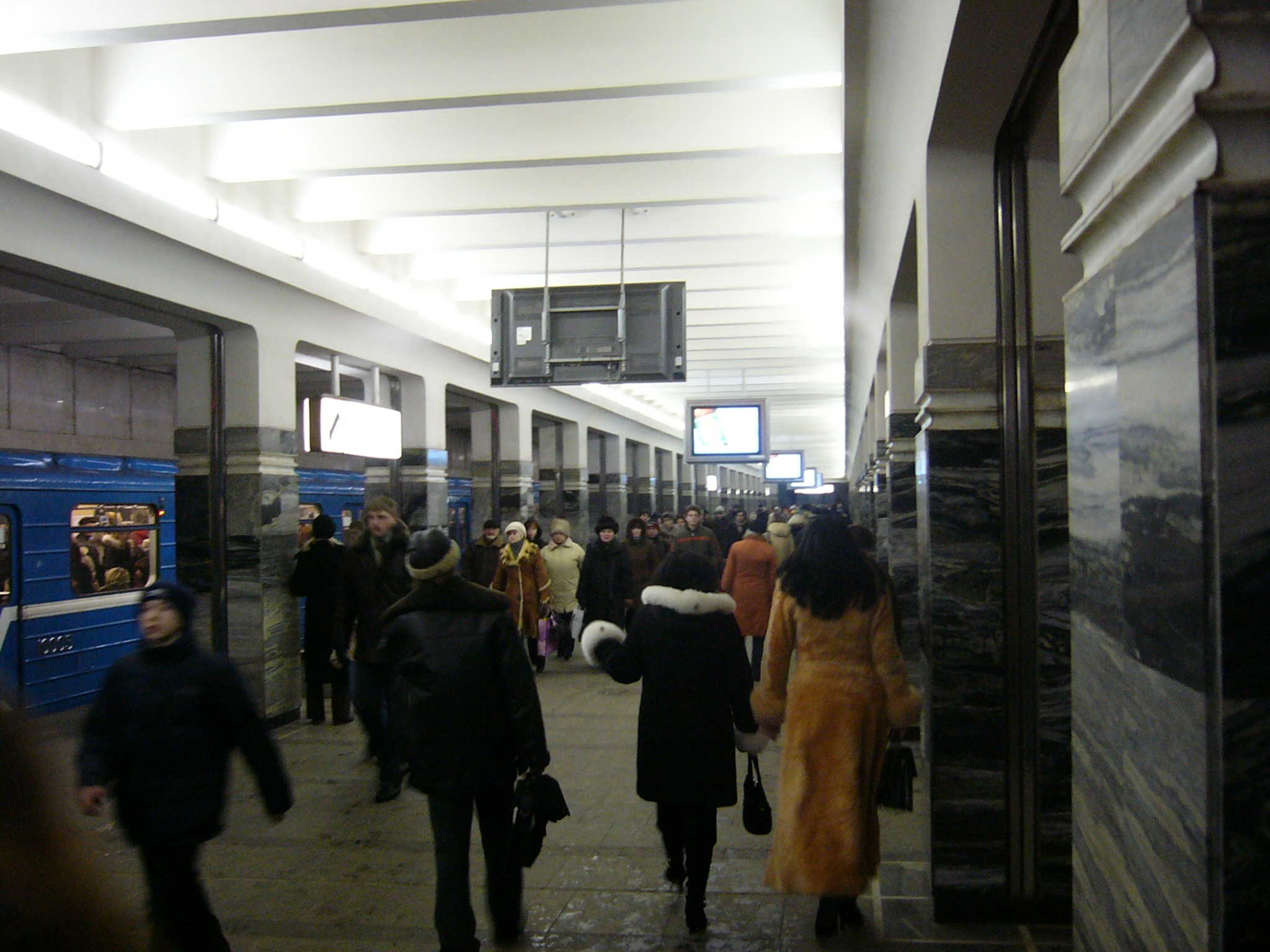
Akademiya Navuk

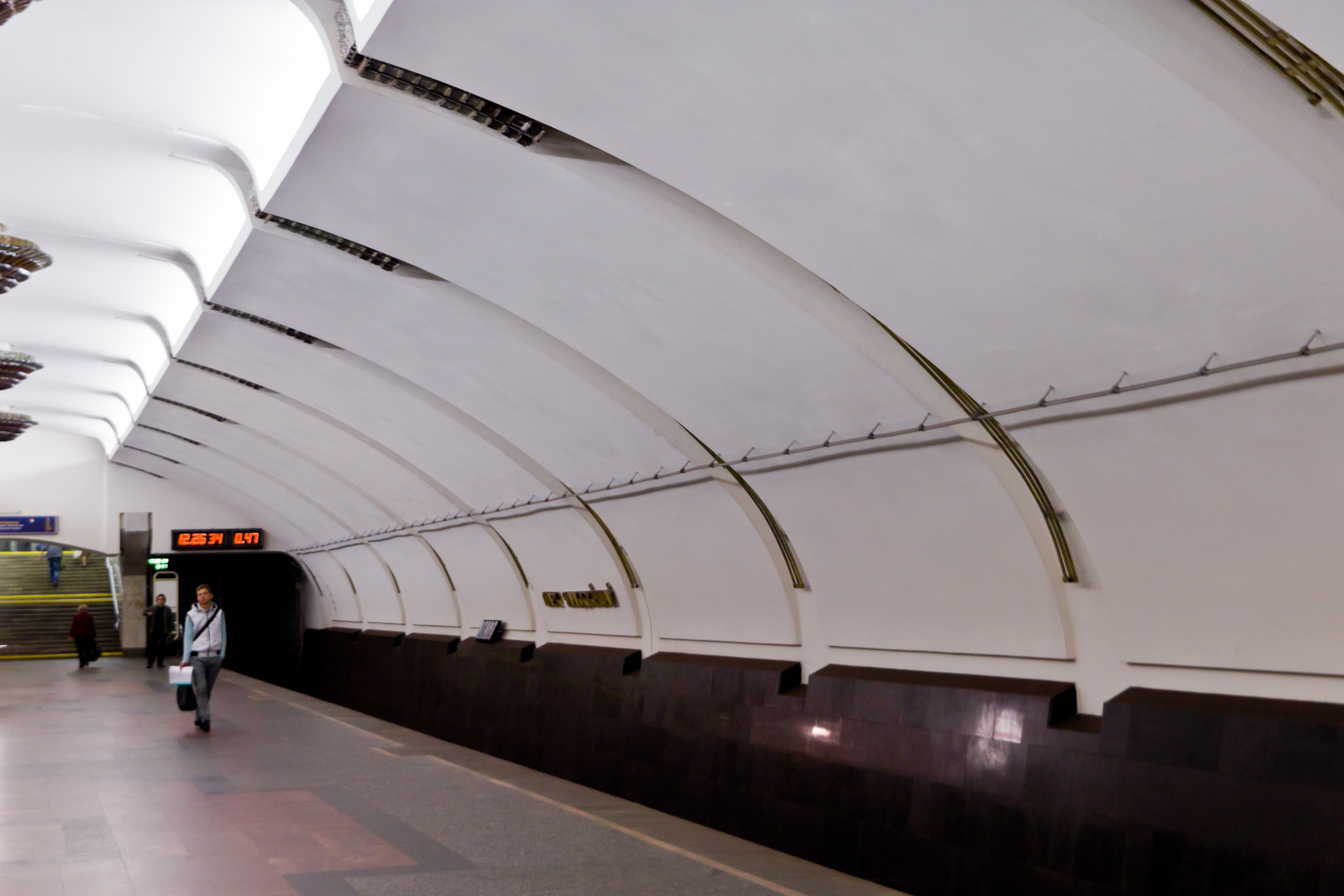
Park Chalyuskintsaw

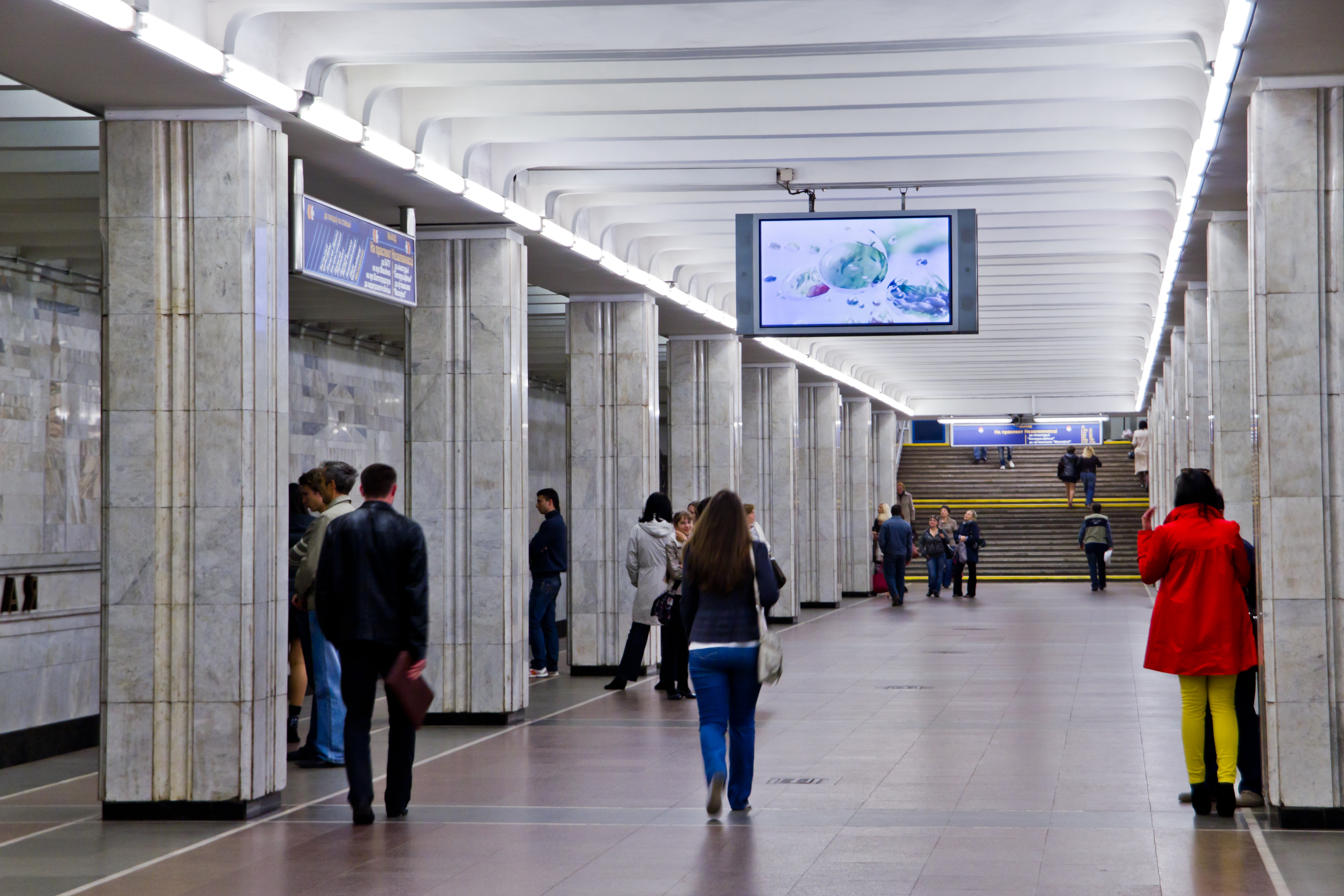
Maskowskaya

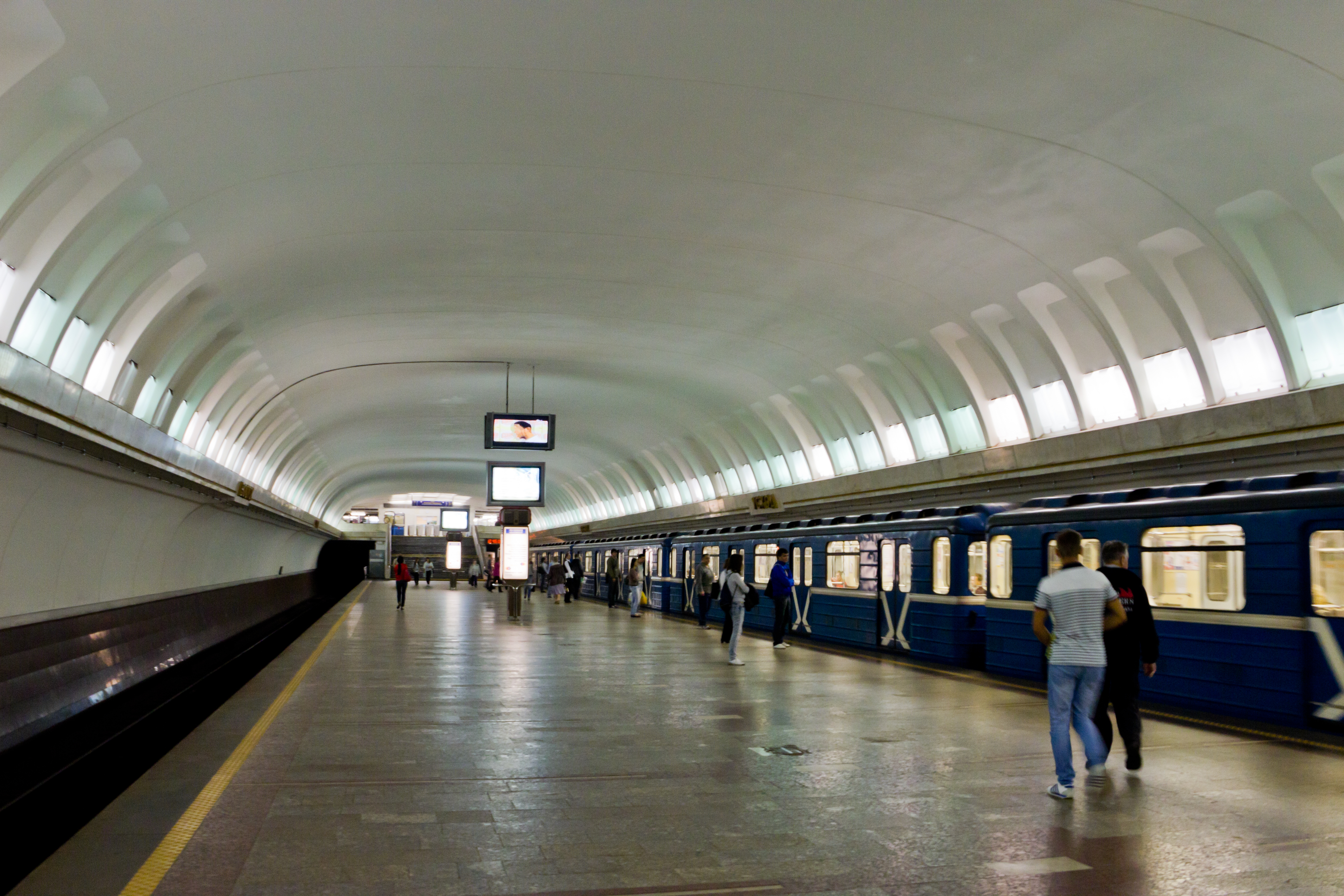
Uskhod

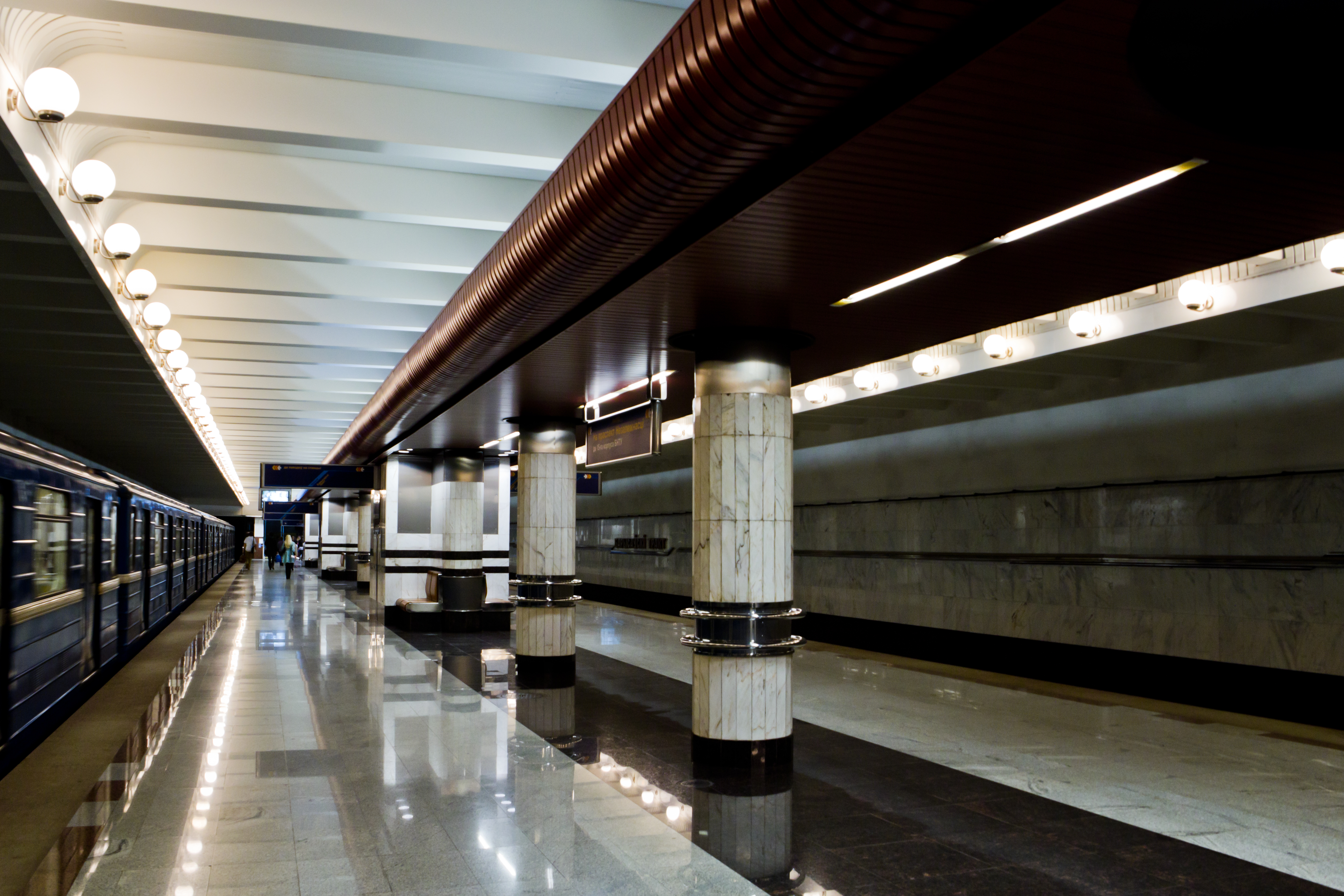
Barysawski trakt

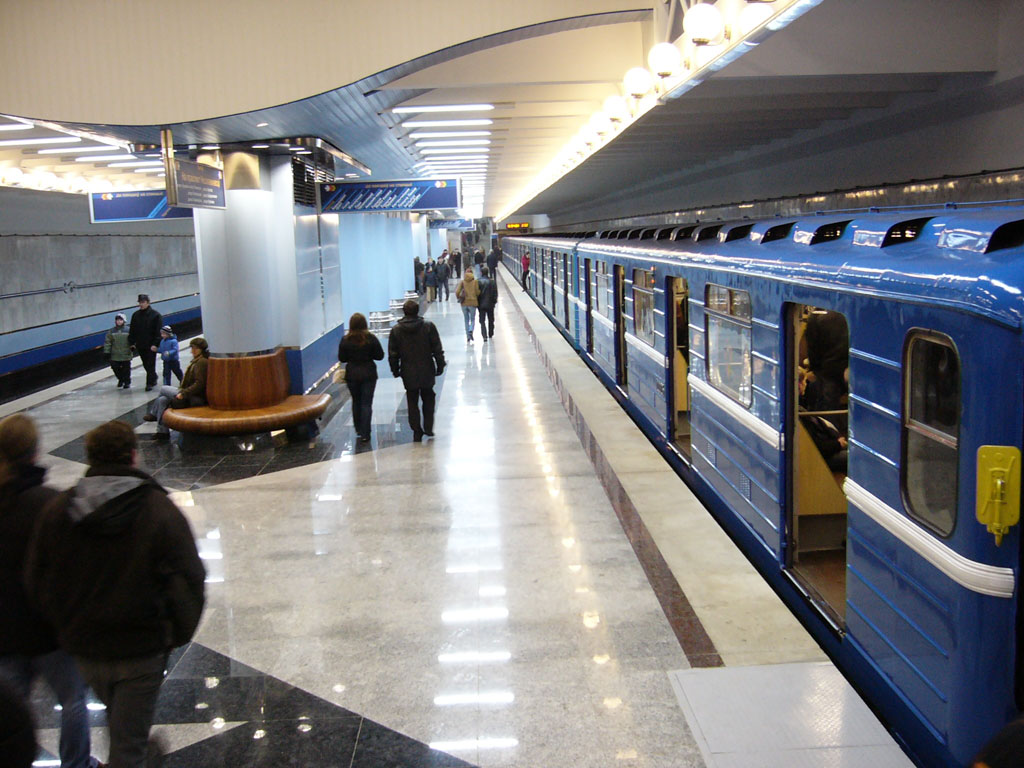
Uruchcha

=== Awtazavodskaya line ===
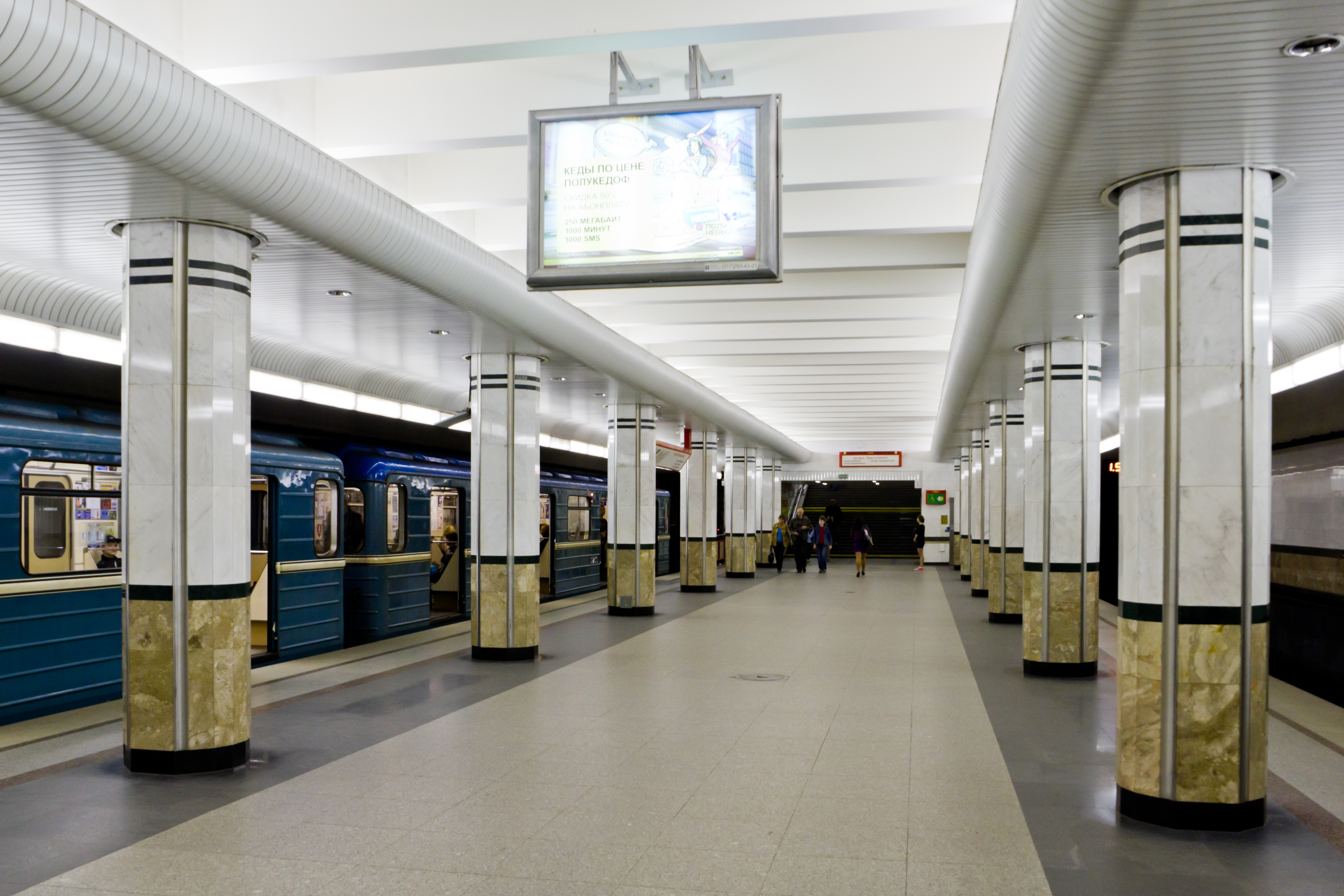
Kamyennaya Horka

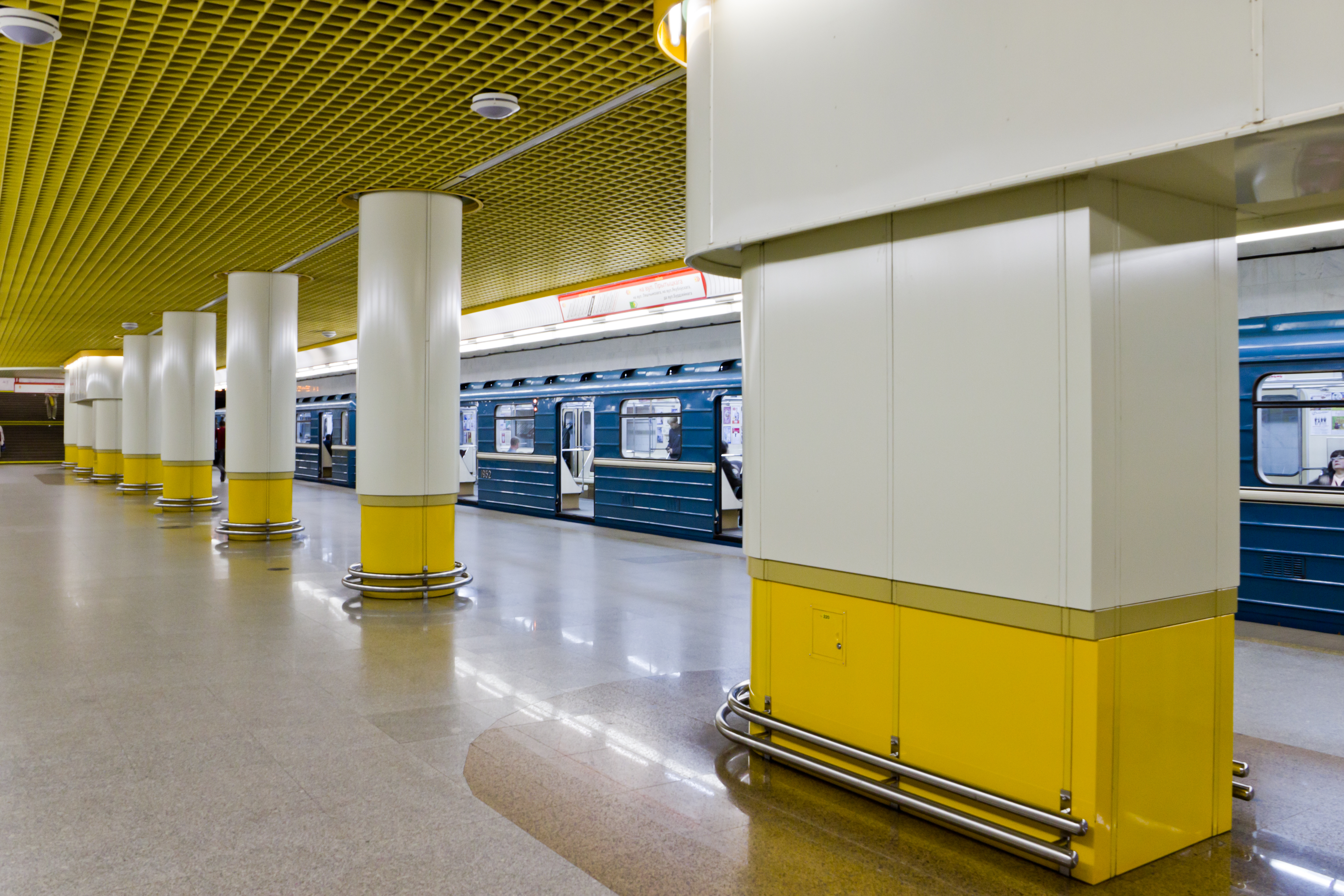
Kuntsawshchyna

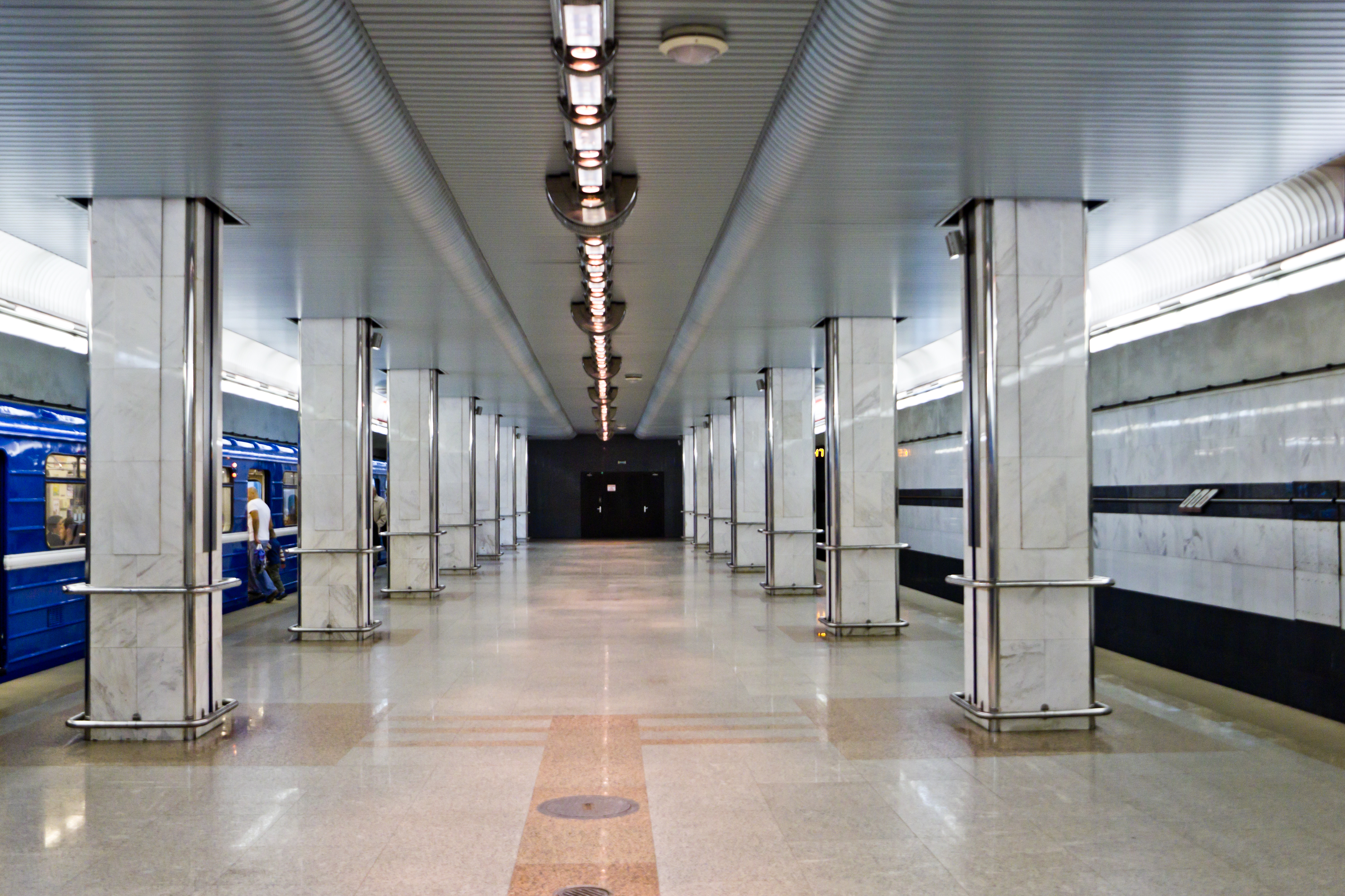
Spartywnaya

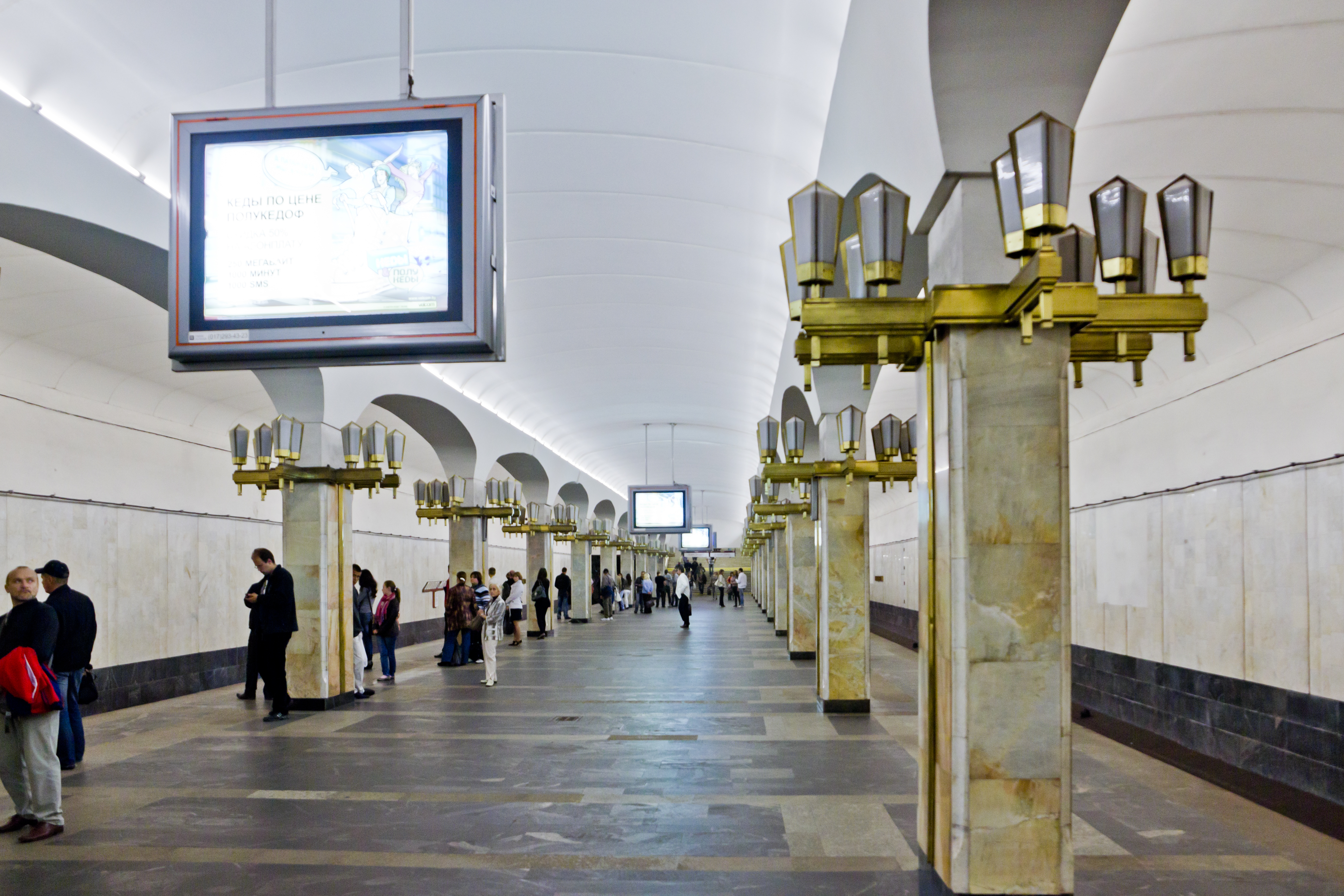
Pushkinskaya

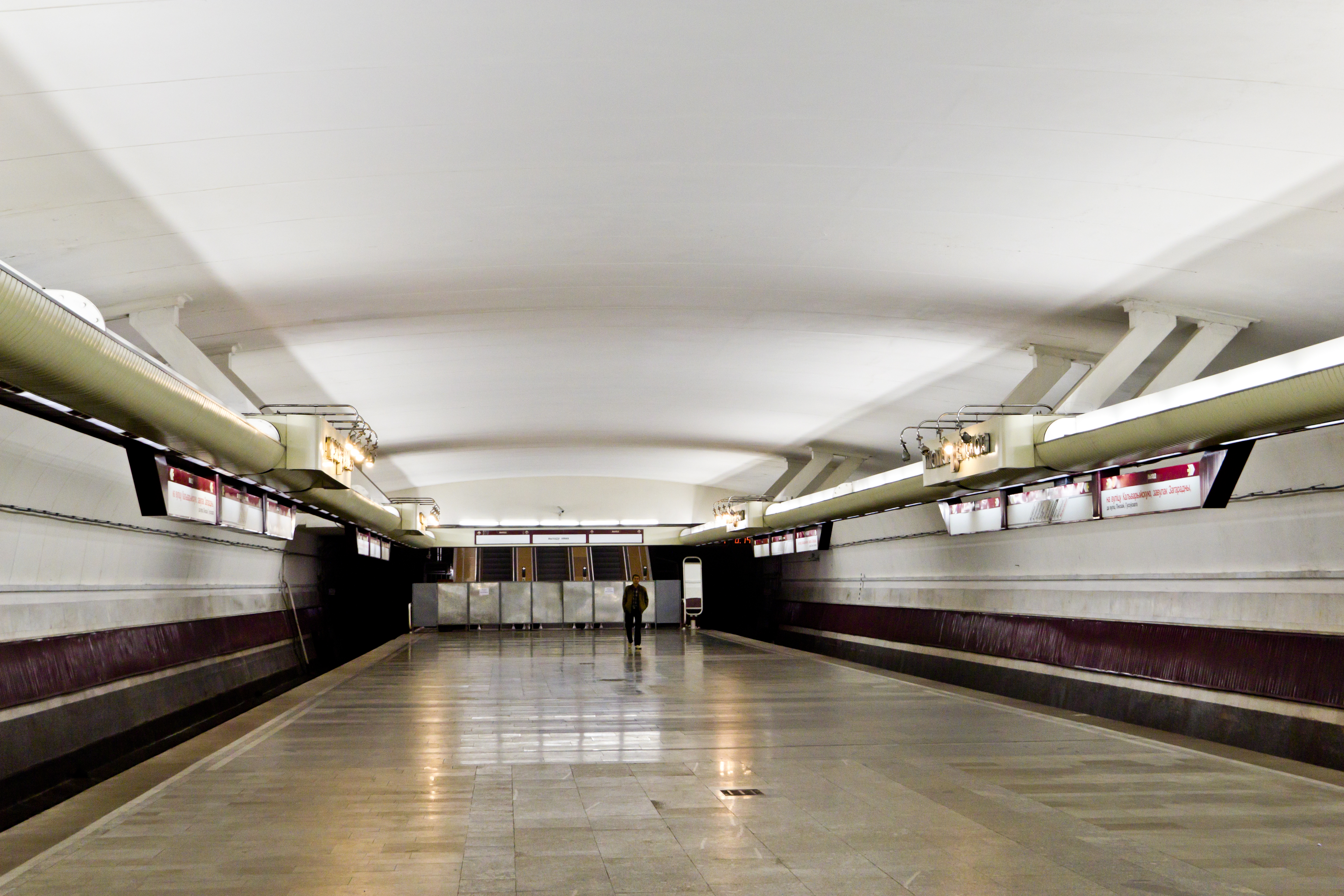
Maladzyozhnaya

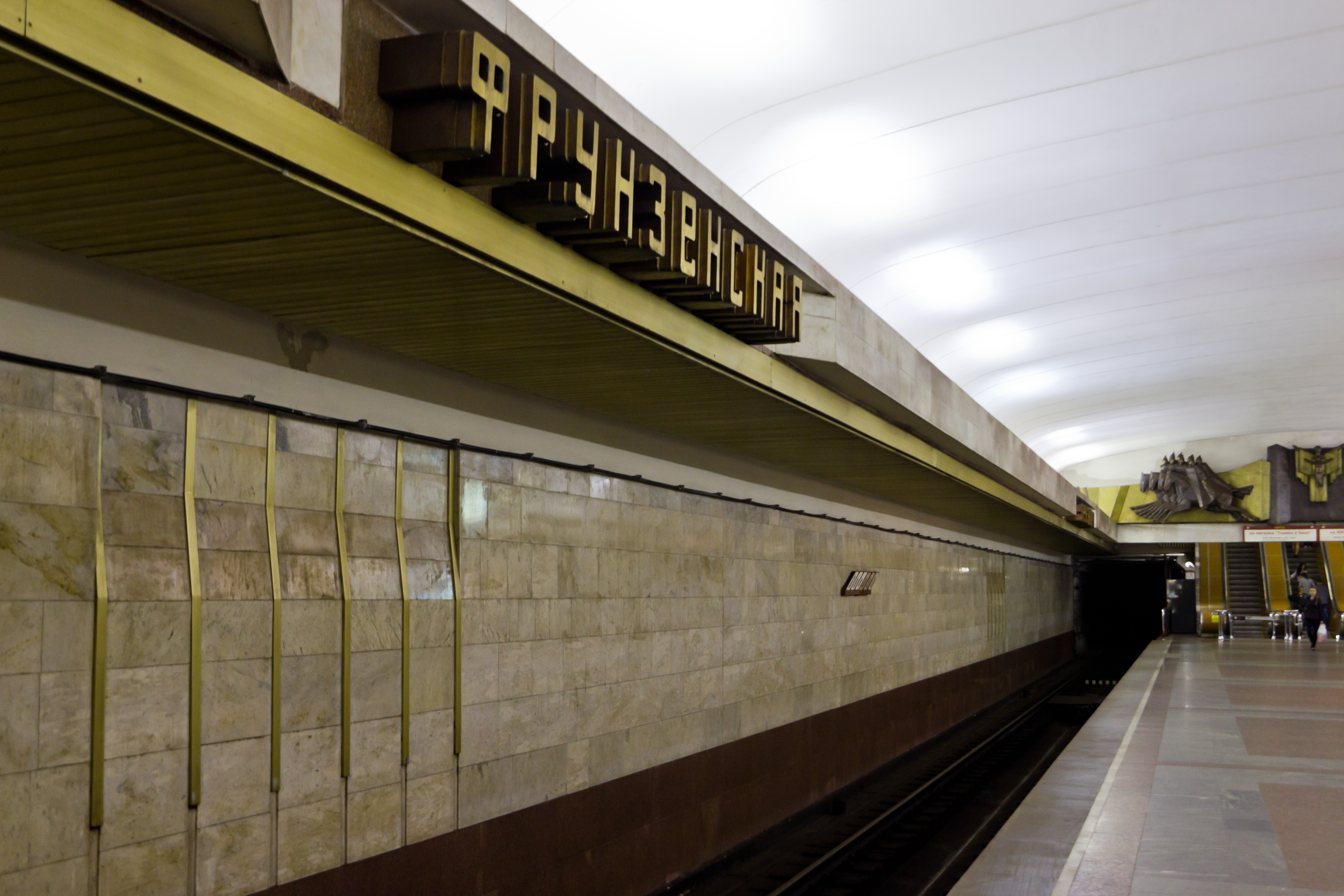
Frunzyenskaya

=== Zyelyenaluzhskaya line ===
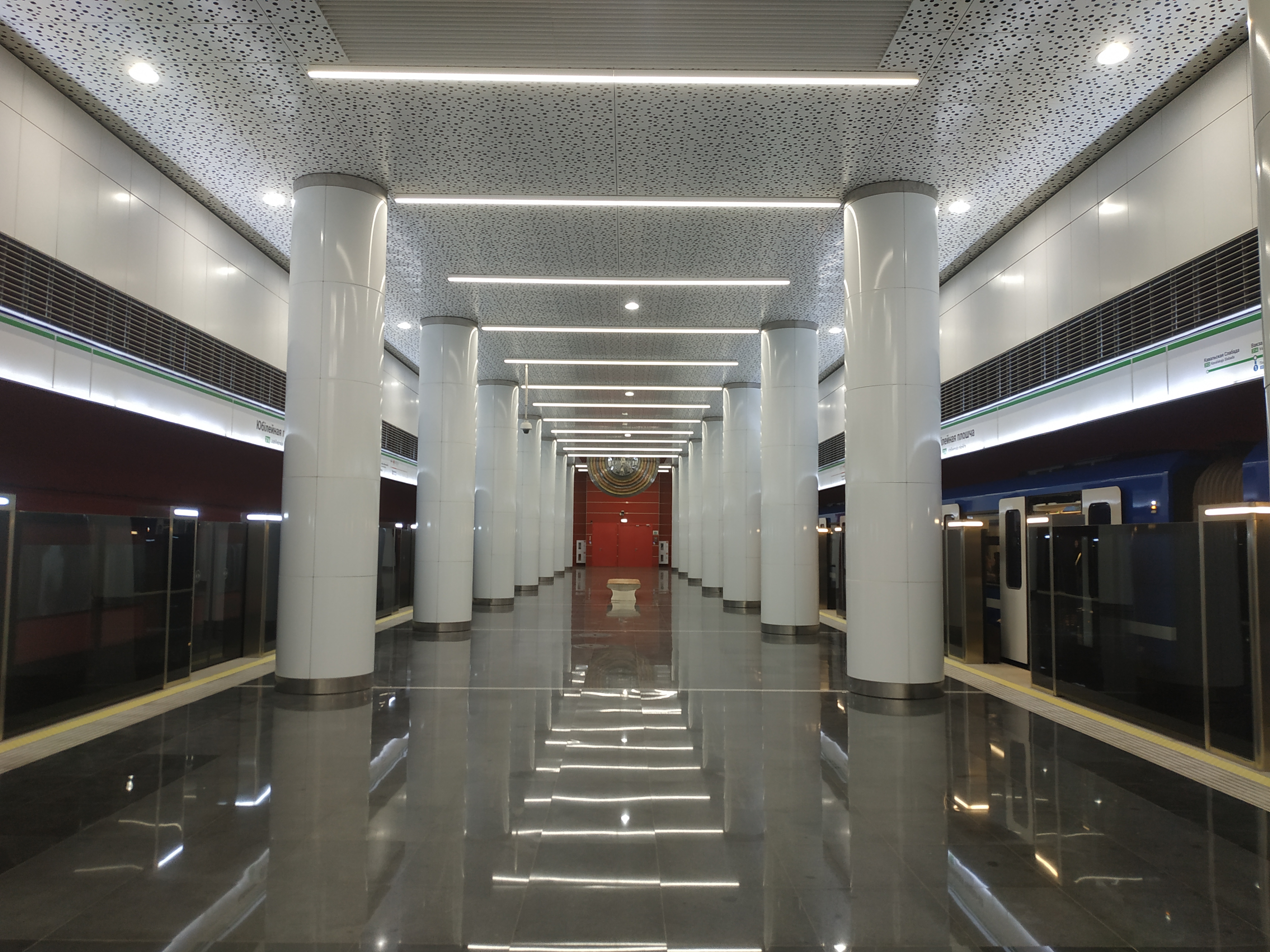
Yubilyeynaya ploshcha

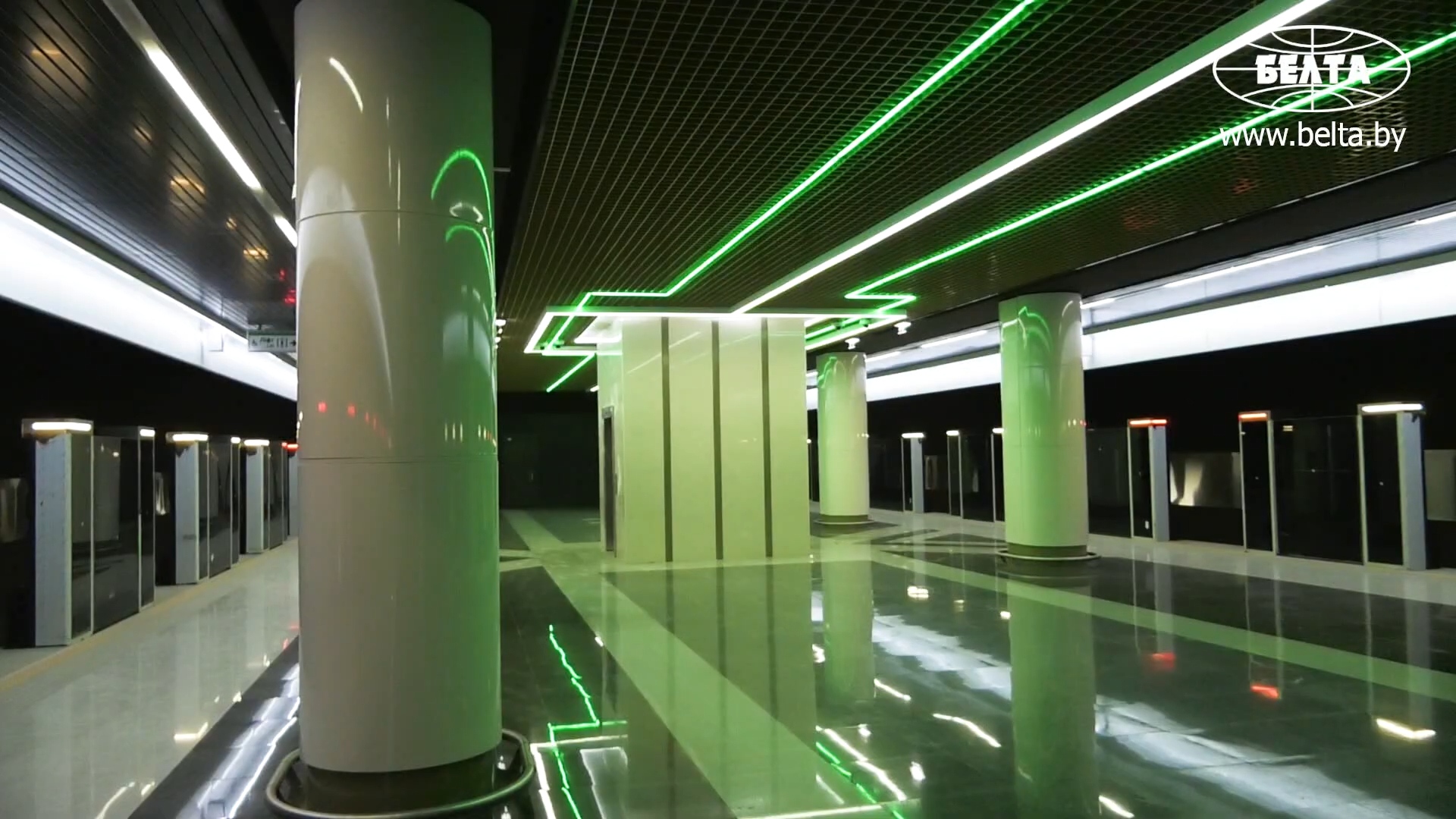
Ploshcha Frantsishka Bahushevicha

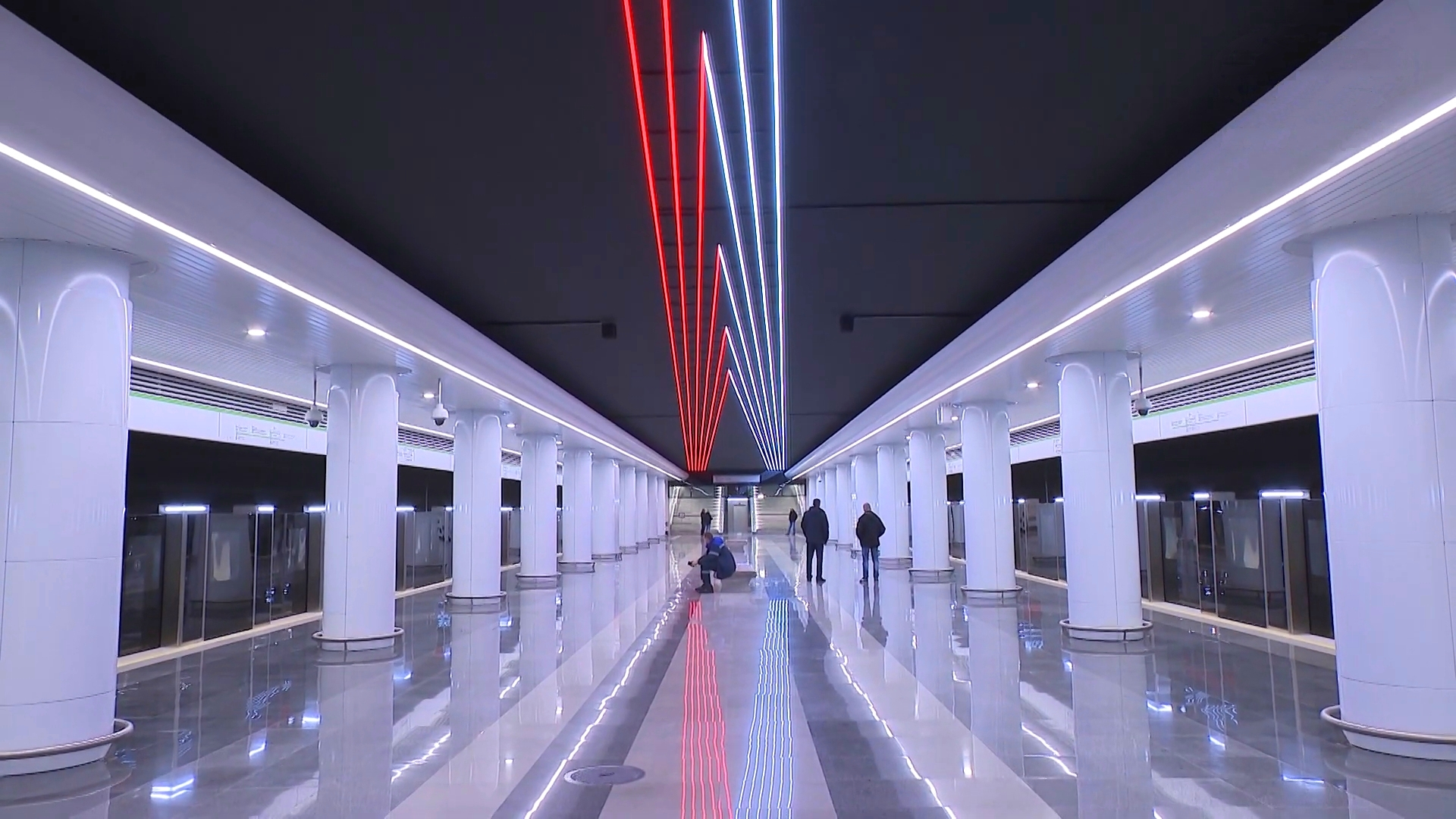
Vakzalnaya

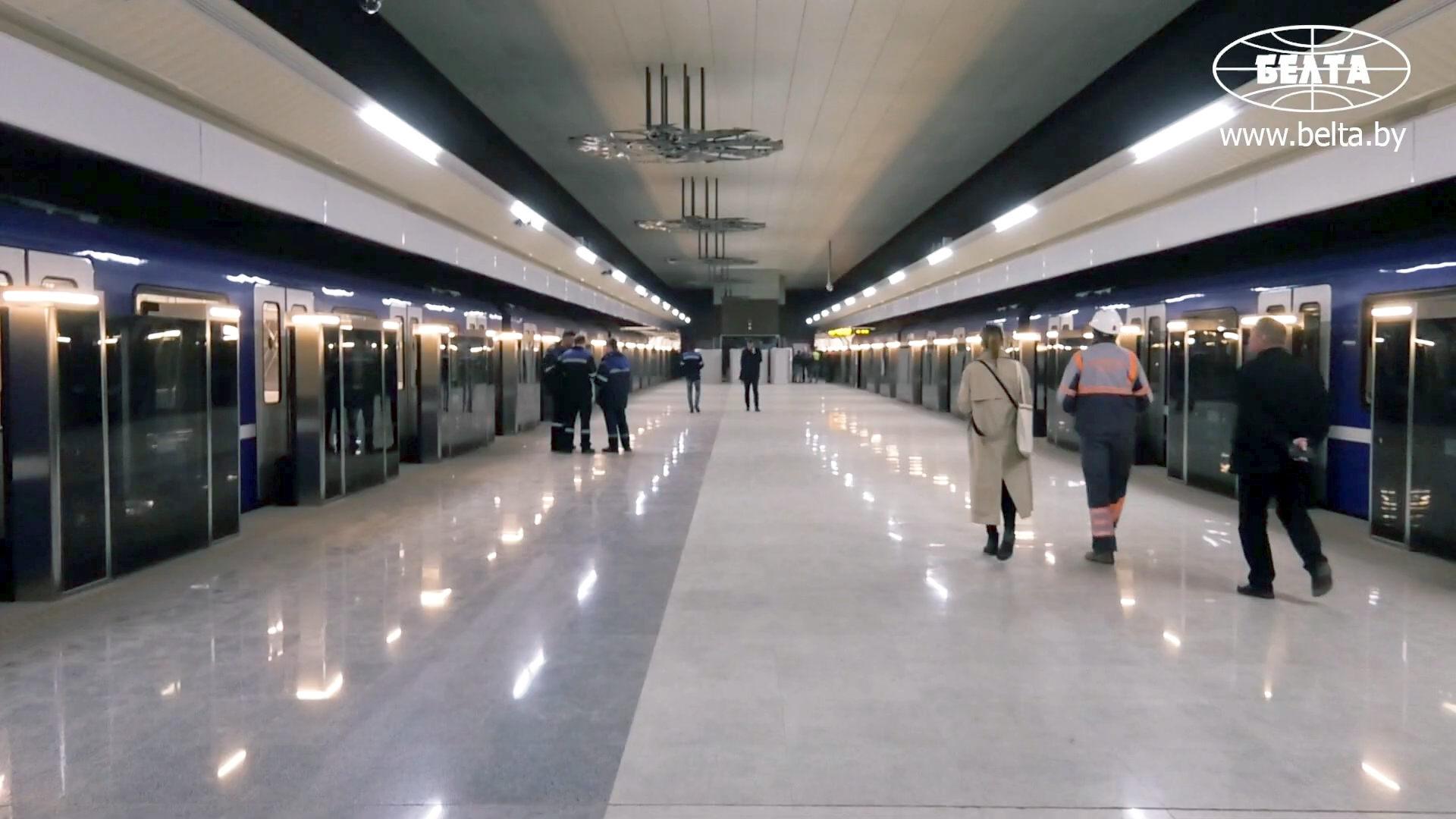
Kavalskaya Slabada

=== Rolling stock ===
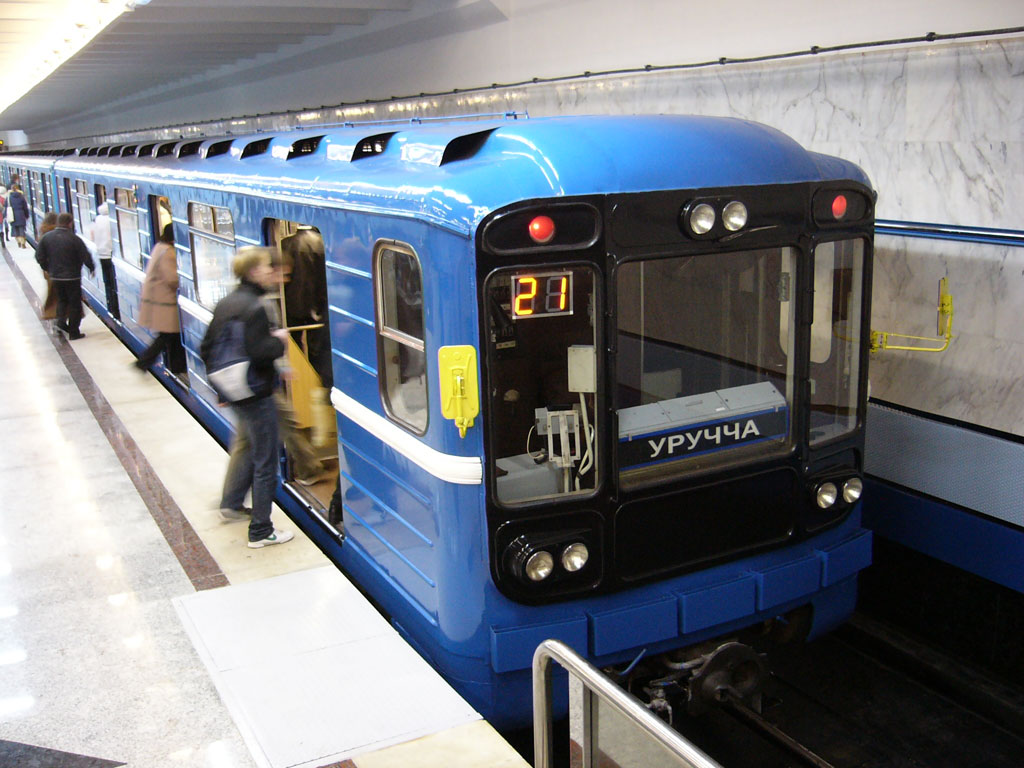
81-717/714

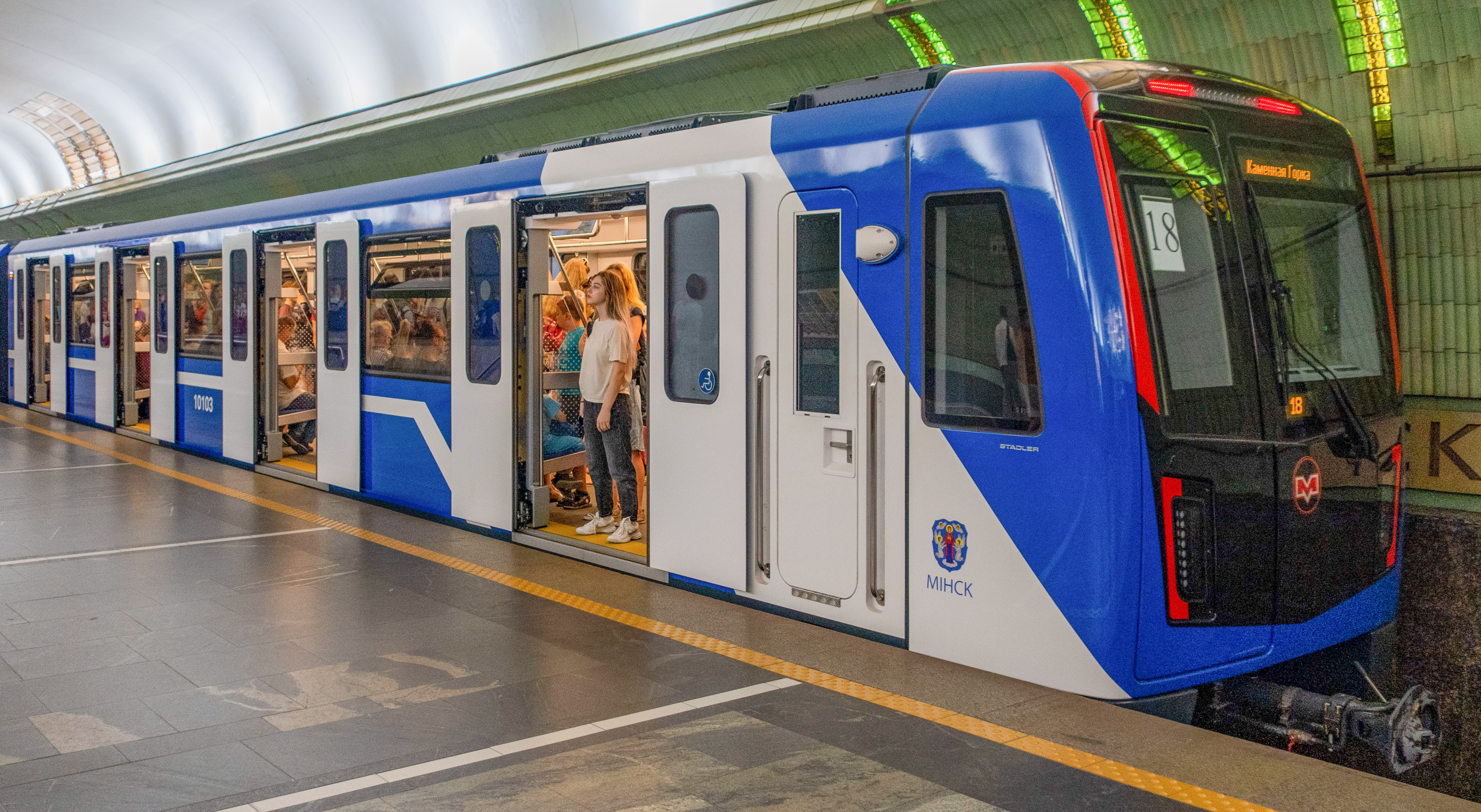
Stadler M110/M111

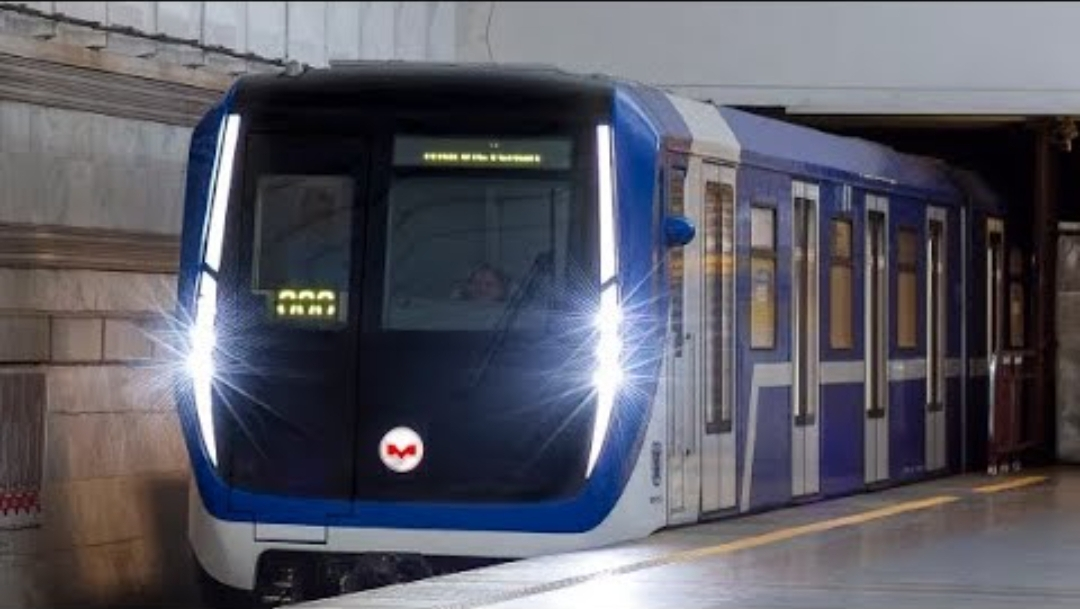
81-765/767

== See also ==
- List of metro systems
