= Malinawka (Minsk Metro) =

Minsk Metro station

Malinawka Малінаўка
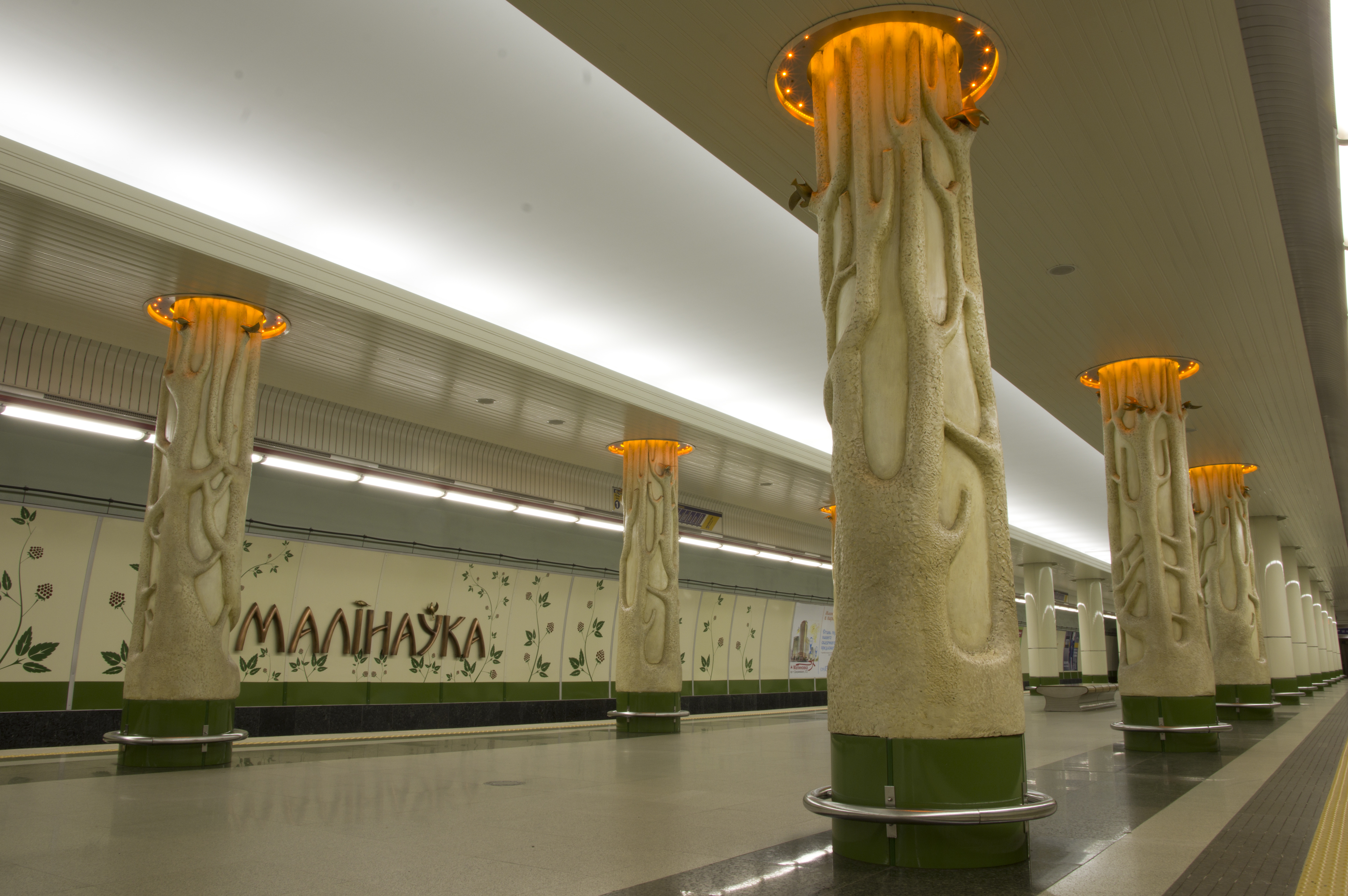

General information
- Other names: Malinaŭka, Malinovka
- Coordinates: 53°50′59.48″N 27°28′29.24″E
- System: Minsk Metro
- Owner: Minsk Metro
- Line: Maskoŭskaja line
- Platforms: Island platform

Construction
- Structure type: Underground

Other information
- Station code: 110

History
- Opened: 3 June 2014; 12 years ago

Services
Preceding station	Minsk Metro	Following station
Pyatrowshchyna towards Uručča	Maskoŭskaja line	Terminus
Location

Malinawka (also referred to as Malinaŭka or Malinovka) (Belarusian: Малінаўка, romanized: Malinaŭka; Russian: Малиновка, romanized: Malinovka) is a Minsk Metro station. It was opened on 3 June 2014. Architectural elements of the station were enhanced by the work of sculptor Maxim Piatrul.

== Gallery ==
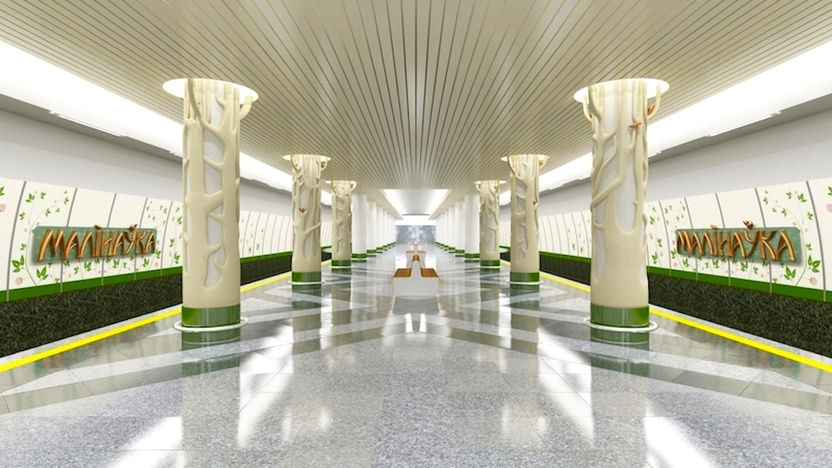

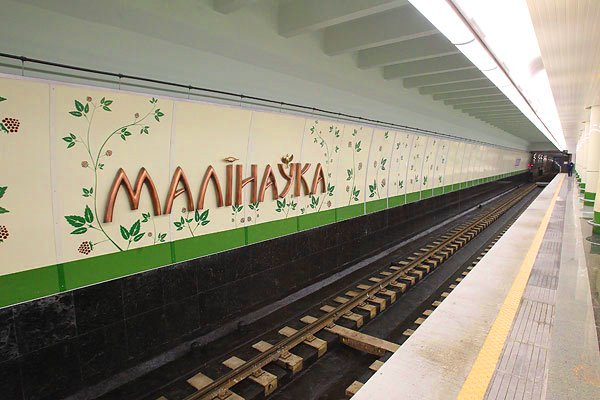

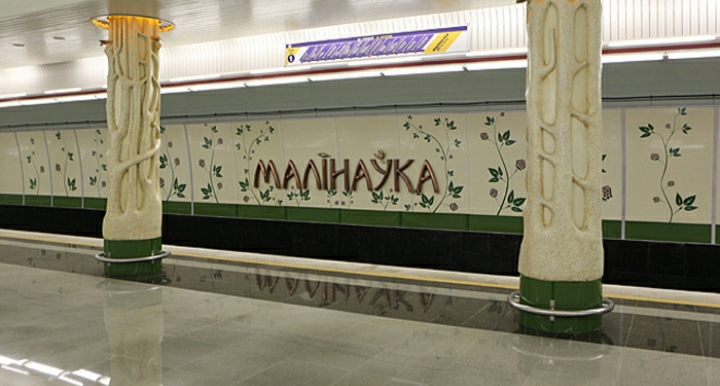
