= Uručča (Minsk Metro) =

Minsk Metro station

Uručča Уручча
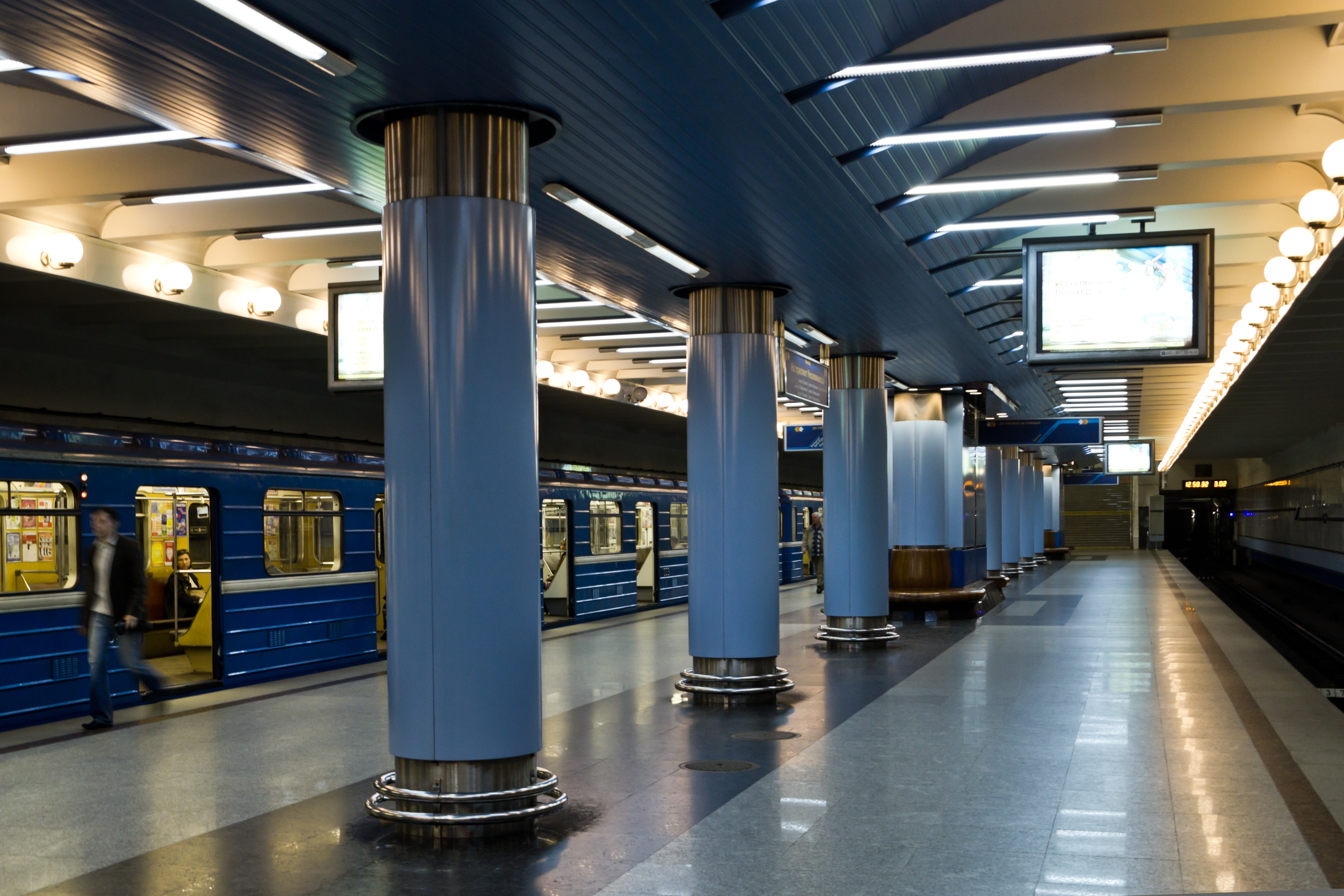
- Station Hall

General information
- Other names: Uruchcha, Uruch'ye
- Coordinates: 53°56′45″N 27°41′23″E
- System: Minsk Metro
- Owner: Minsk Metro
- Line: Maskoŭskaja line
- Platforms: 1 island platform
- Tracks: 2

Construction
- Structure type: Underground
- Depth: 8 m (26 ft)

Other information
- Station code: 124

History
- Opened: 7 November 2007; 18 years ago

Services
| Preceding station | Minsk Metro | Following station |
|---|---|---|
| Terminus | Maskoŭskaja line | Barysaŭski trakt towards Malinawka |
Location
- Location within Belarus

Uručča (also referred to as Uruchcha or Uruch'ye) (Belarusian: Уручча, [uˈruttʂa]; Russian: Уручье, romanized: Uruch'ye, pronounced [ʊˈrutɕjɪ]; lit. 'Brookside') is a Minsk Metro station, a terminus of the Maskoŭskaja line. Opened on 7 November 2007 it is the first station outside the Minsk Automobile Ring Road, located in the Uručča ('Brookside') microraion of Minsk's Metropolitan Borough of Pershamayski.

The station is shallow, in a pillar by-span design. As with all the recently built metro stations in Minsk, it has disabled access. The station is in the middle of the Uručča microraion on the northeastern edge of the city, with numerous connections to provincial bus routes and to Minsk International Airport.

== Gallery ==
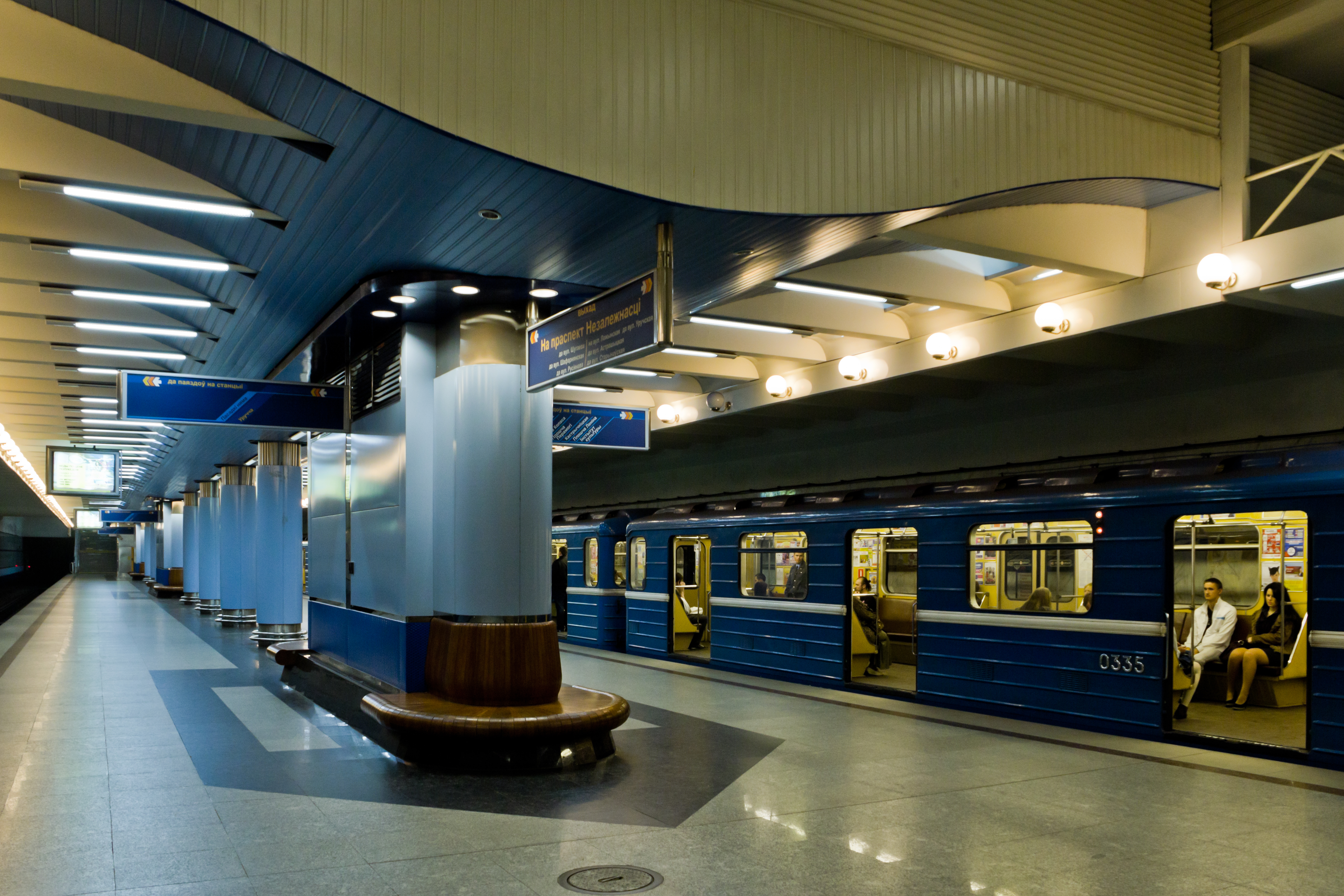

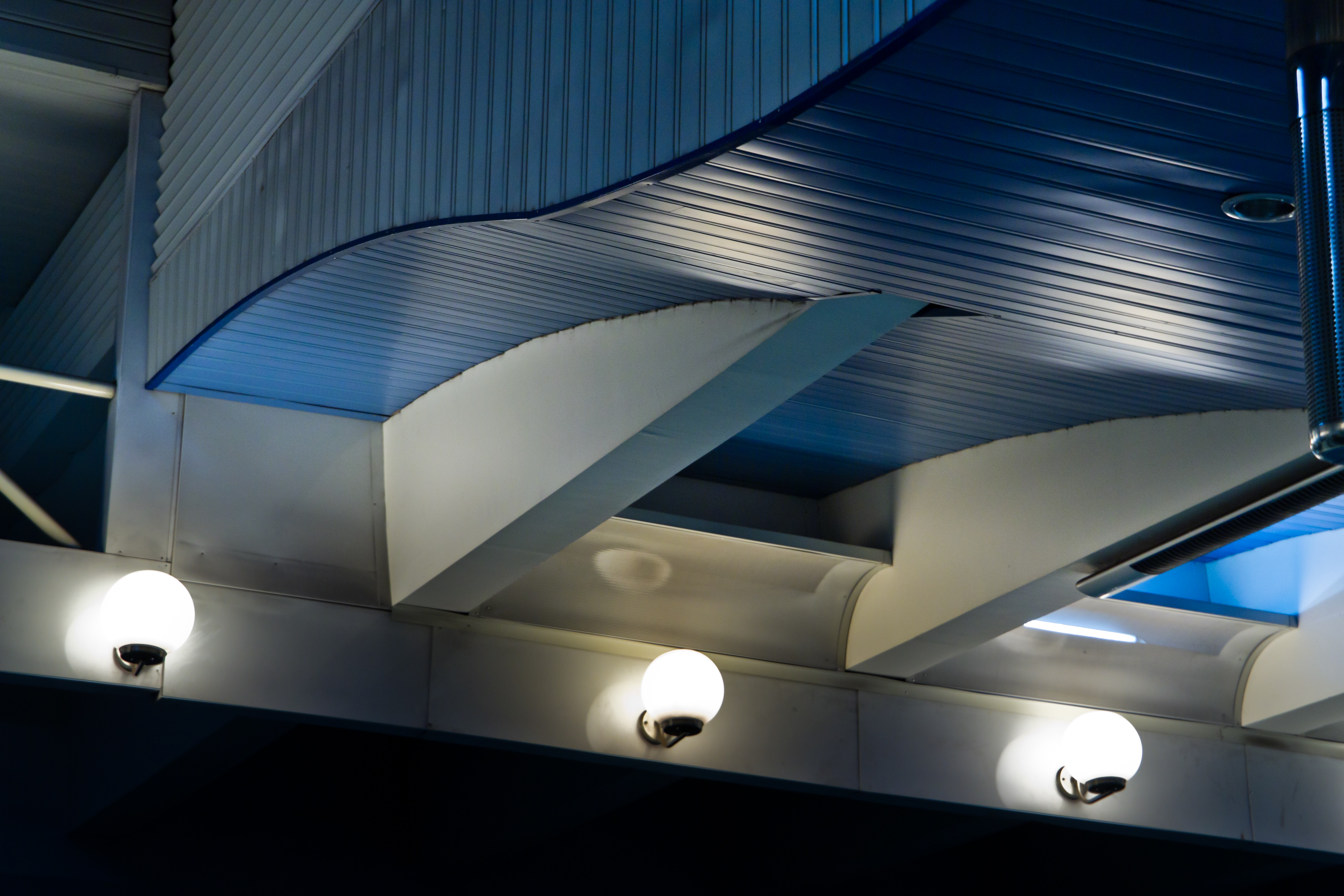

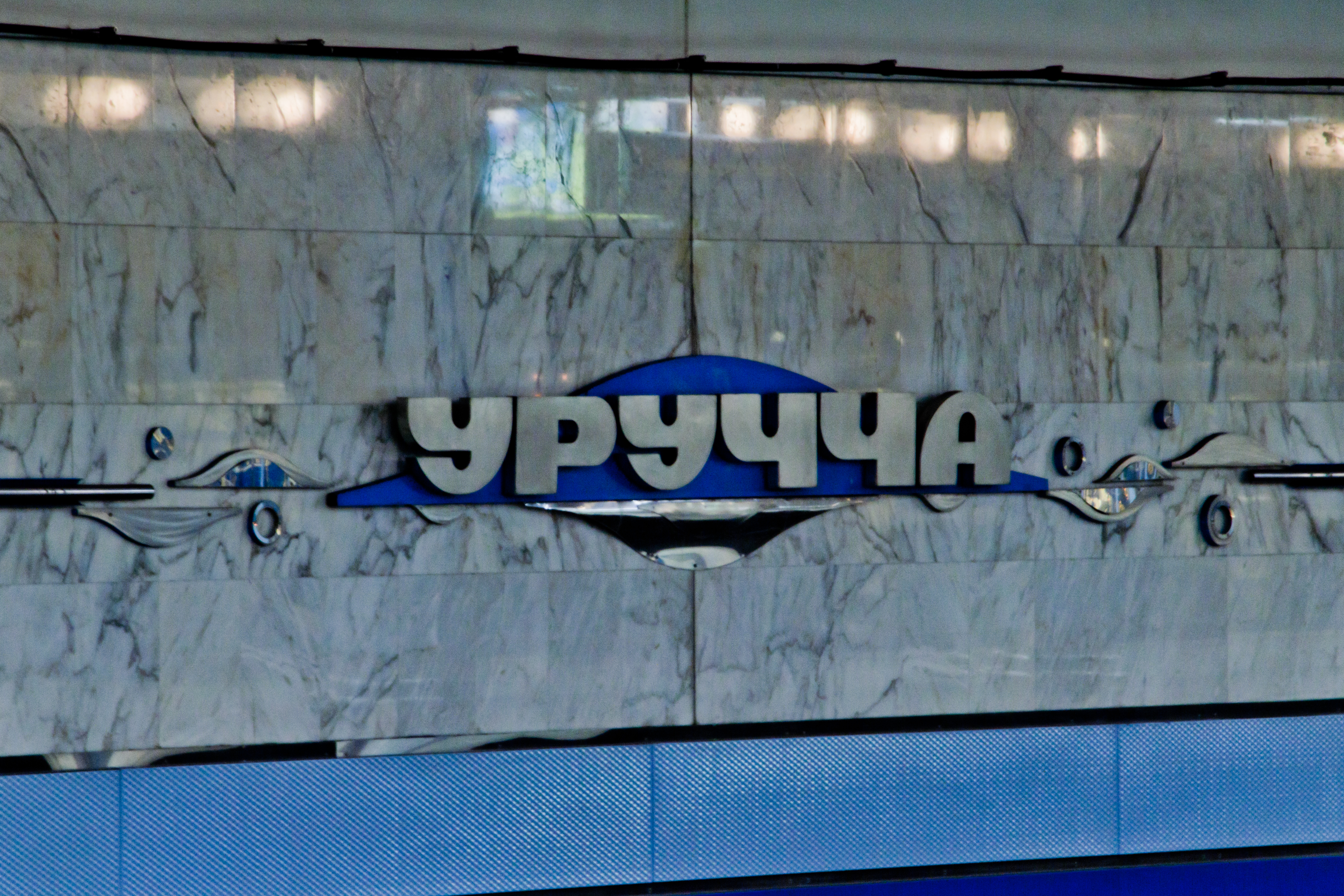

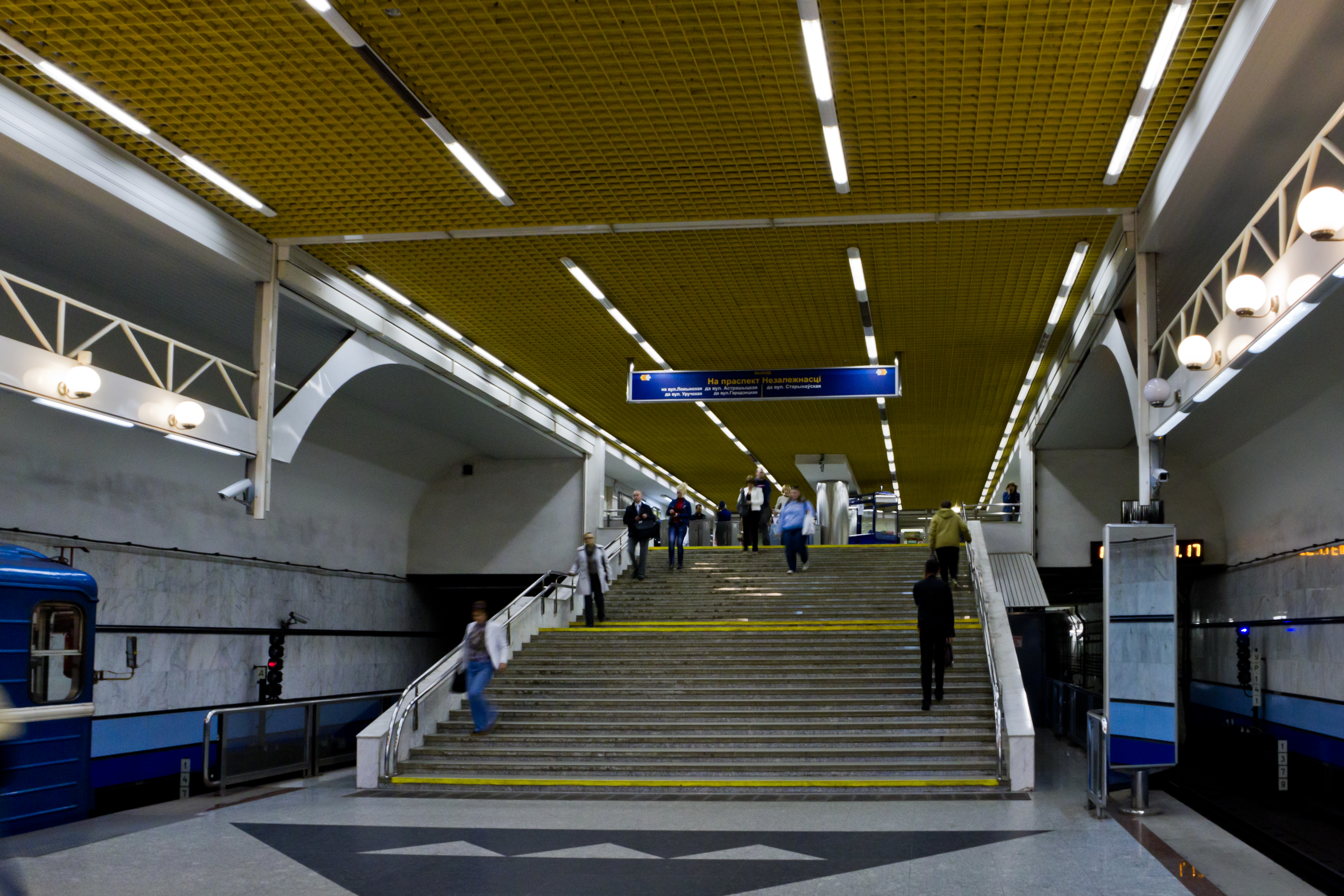

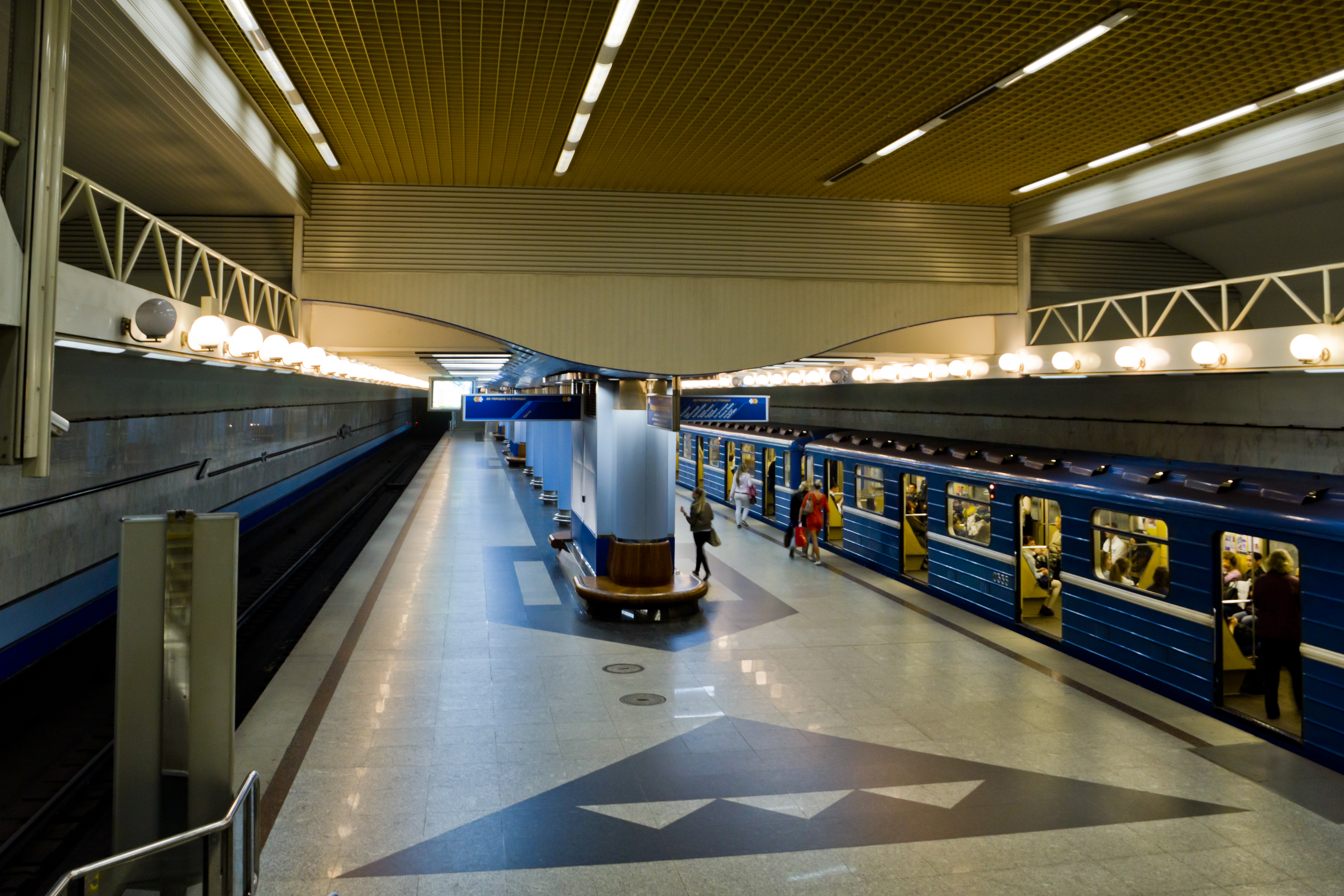

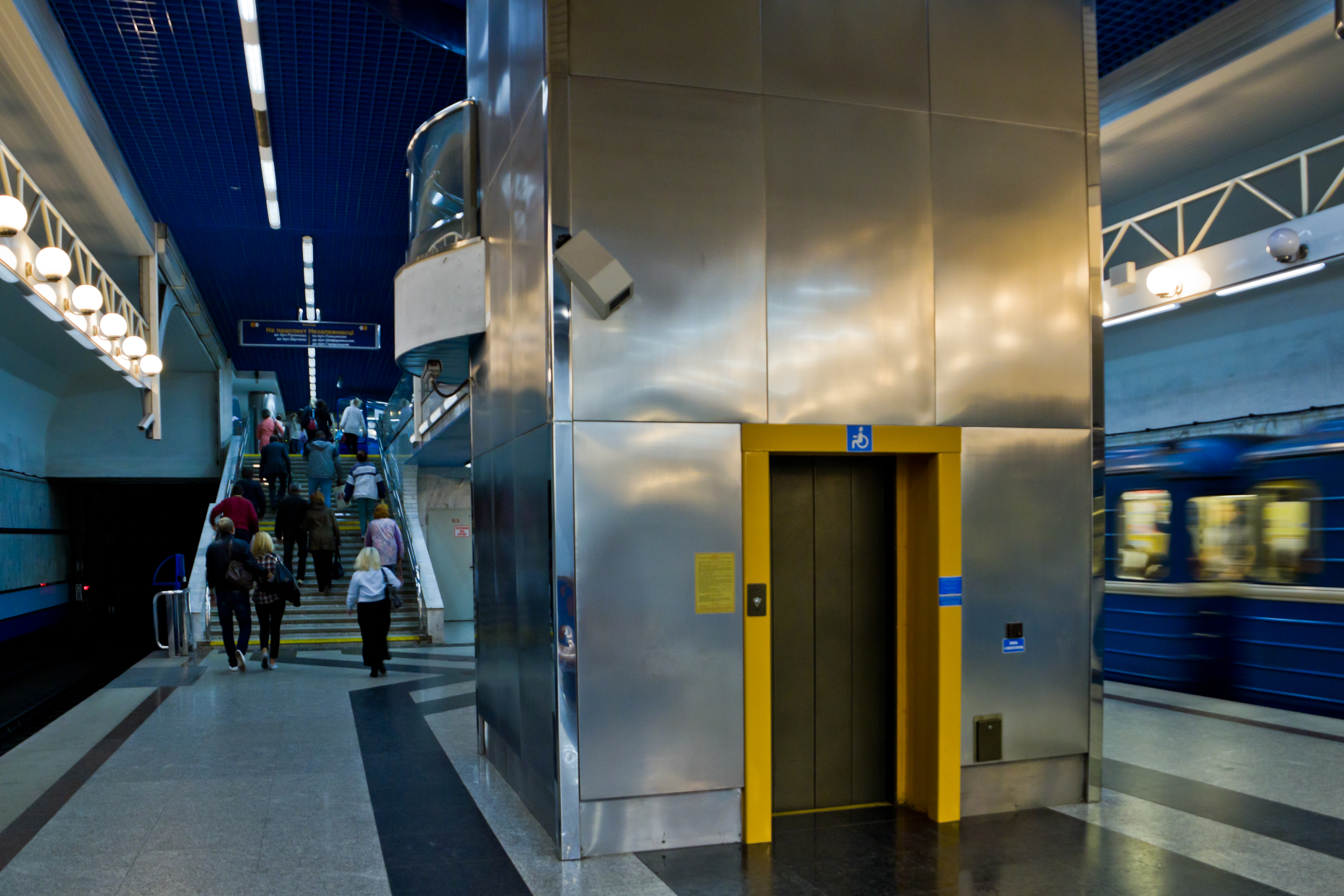

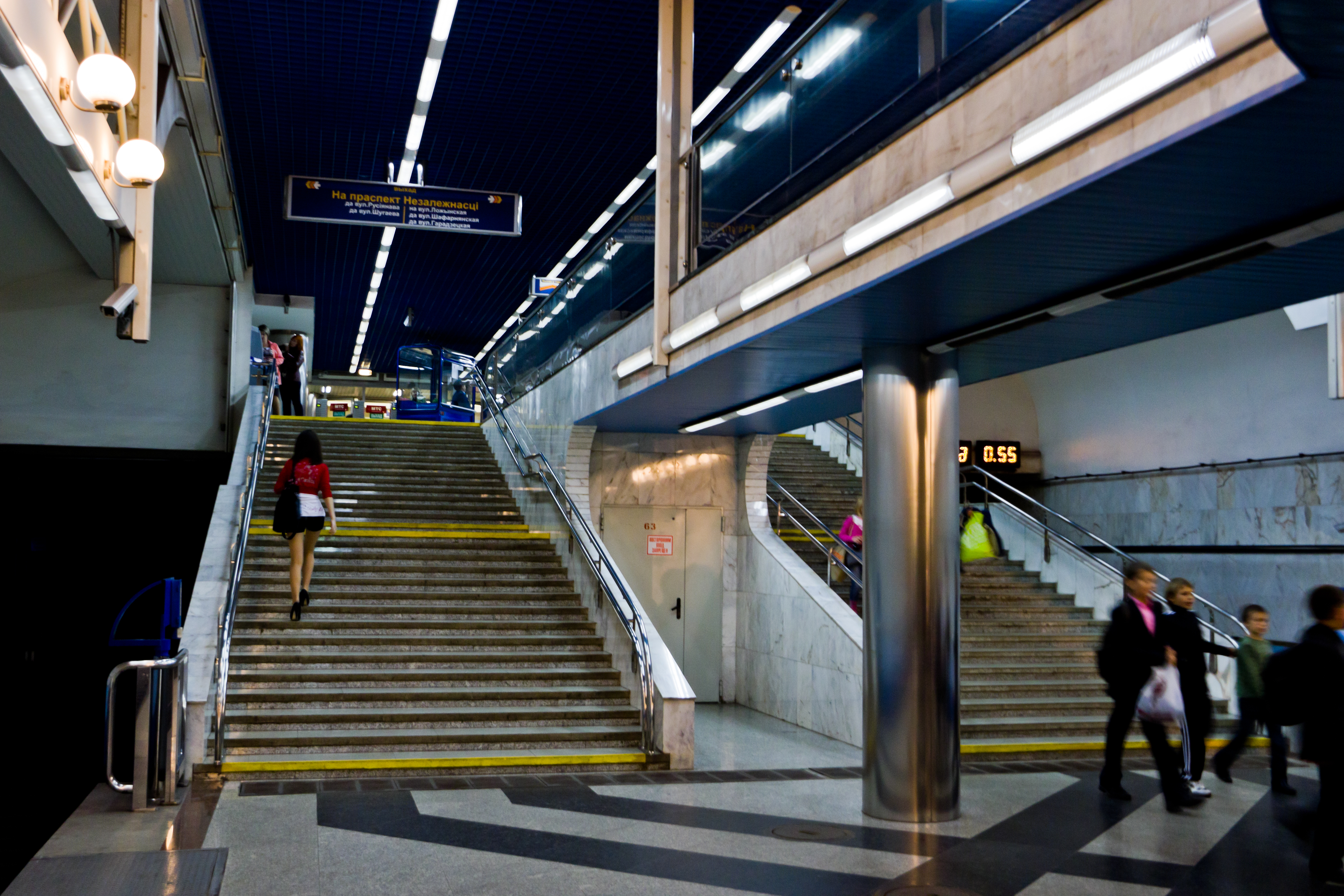

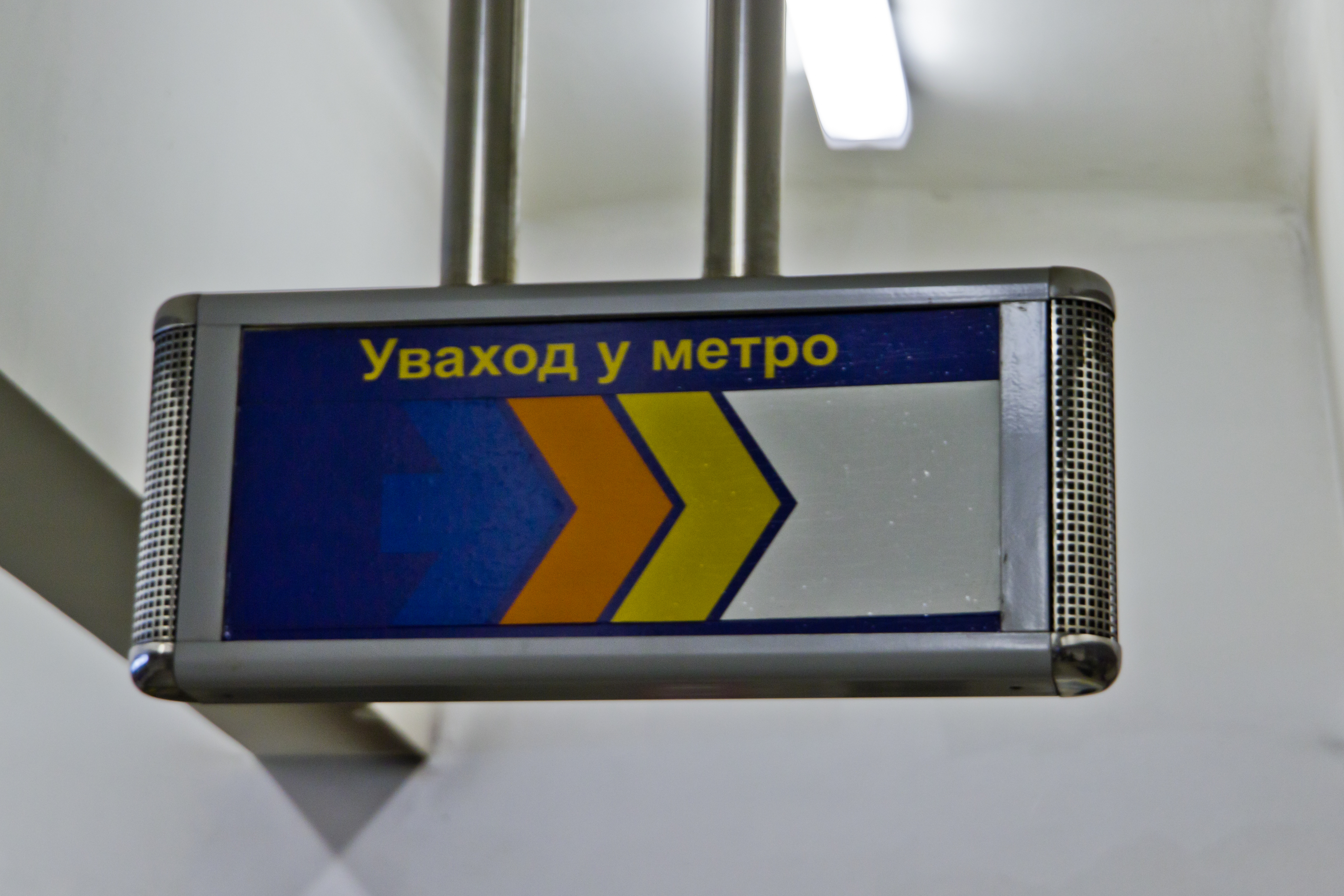

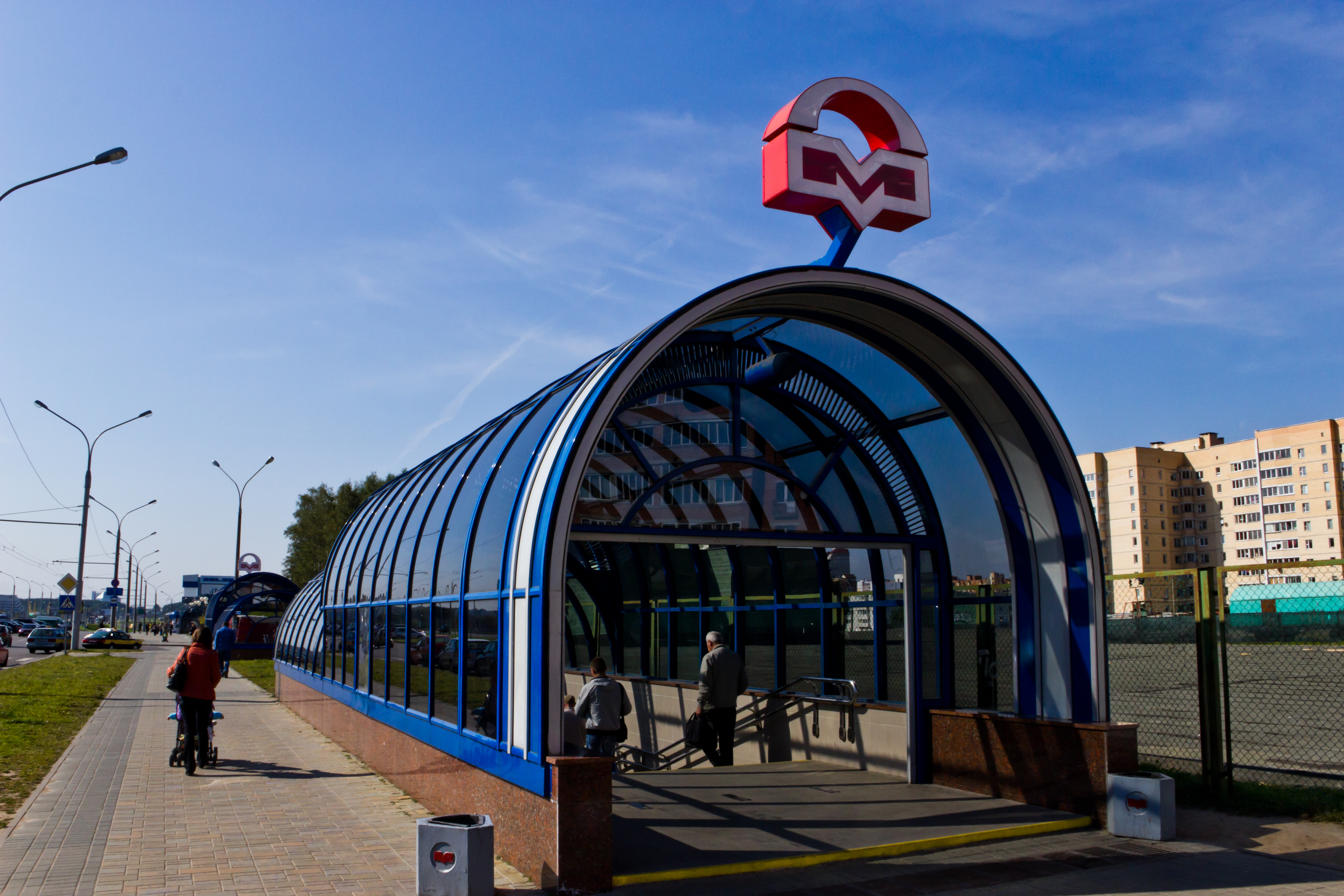
