= List of Minsk Metro stations =

This is a list of Minsk Metro stations in Minsk, Belarus, excluding the abandoned, projected or planned stations, and those under construction.

== List of active stations ==
Line	Romanization	Belarusian	Transfer	Opened
Maskowskaya line	Uručča	Уручча		7 November 2007
Maskowskaya line	Barysaŭski trakt	Барысаўскі тракт		7 November 2007
Maskowskaya line	Uschod	Усход		30 December 1986
Maskowskaya line	Maskoŭskaja	Маскоўская		26 June 1984
Maskowskaya line	Park Čaliuskincaŭ	Парк Чалюскінцаў		26 June 1984
Maskowskaya line	Akademiya Navuk	Акадэмія навук		26 June 1984
Maskowskaya line	Ploshcha Yakuba Kolasa	Плошча Якуба Коласа		26 June 1984
Maskowskaya line	Ploshcha Pyeramohi	Плошча Перамогі		26 June 1984
Maskowskaya line	Kastrychnitskaya	Кастрычніцкая	Kupalawskaya	26 June 1984
Maskowskaya line	Ploshcha Lyenina	Плошча Леніна	Vakzaĺnaja	26 June 1984
Maskowskaya line	Instytut Kultury	Інстытут Культуры		26 June 1984
Maskowskaya line	Hrushawka	Грушаўка		7 November 2012
Maskowskaya line	Mikhalova	Міхалова		7 November 2012
Maskowskaya line	Pyatrowshchyna	Пятроўшчына		7 November 2012
Maskowskaya line	Malinawka	Малінаўка		3 June 2014
Awtazavodskaya line	Kamyennaya Horka	Каменная Горка		7 November 2005
Awtazavodskaya line	Kuntsawshchyna	Кунцаўшчына		7 November 2005
Awtazavodskaya line	Spartywnaya	Спартыўная		7 November 2005
Awtazavodskaya line	Pushkinskaya	Пушкінская		3 July 1995
Awtazavodskaya line	Maladzyozhnaya	Маладзёжная		3 July 1995
Awtazavodskaya line	Frunzyenskaya	Фрунзенская	Jubiliejnaja plošča	31 December 1990
Awtazavodskaya line	Nyamiha	Няміга		31 December 1990
Awtazavodskaya line	Kupalawskaya	Купалаўская	Kastrychnitskaya	31 December 1990
Awtazavodskaya line	Pyershamayskaya	Першамайская		28 May 1991
Awtazavodskaya line	Pralyetarskaya	Пралетарская		31 December 1990
Awtazavodskaya line	Traktarny zavod	Трактарны завод		31 December 1990
Awtazavodskaya line	Partyzanskaya	Партызанская		7 November 1997
Awtazavodskaya line	Awtazavodskaya	Аўтазаводская		7 November 1997
Awtazavodskaya line	Mahilyowskaya	Магілёўская		5 September 2001
Zelenaluzhskaya line	Jubiliejnaja plošča	Юбілейная плошча	Frunzyenskaya	6 November 2020
Zelenaluzhskaya line	Plošča Franciška Bahuševiča	Плошча Францішка Багушэвіча		6 November 2020
Zelenaluzhskaya line	Vakzaĺnaja	Вакзальная	Ploshcha Lyenina	6 November 2020
Zelenaluzhskaya line	Kavaĺskaja Slabada	Кавальская Слабада		6 November 2020
Zelenaluzhskaya line	Aeradromnaya	Аэрадромная		30 December 2024
Zelenaluzhskaya line	Nemarshanski Sad	Немаршанскі Сад		30 December 2024
Zelenaluzhskaya line	Slutski Hastsinets	Слуцкі Гасцінец		30 December 2024
