= Aeradromnaya (Minsk Metro) =

Minsk Metro station

Coordinates: 53.8677°N 27.5469°E

Aeradromnaya Аэродромная

General information
- System: Minsk Metro
- Line(s): Zelenaluzhskaya line

History
- Opened: 30 December 2024; 9 months ago
Location

Aeradromnaya (Belarusian: Аэрадромная, Russian: Аэродромная, Aerodromnaya) is a Minsk Metro station on Zelenaluzhskaya line. It was opened on 30 December 2024 by Alexander Lukashenko as a part of three-station extension of the line from Kavalskaya Slabada to Slutski Hastsinets. The adjacent stations are Kavalskaya Slabada and Nemarshanski Sad.
