= Nemarshanski Sad =

Minsk Metro station

Coordinates: 53.8501°N 27.5367°E

Nemarshanskiy Sad Немаршанскi Сад

General information
- System: Minsk Metro
- Line(s): Zelenaluzhskaya line

History
- Opened: 30 December 2024; 9 months ago
Location

Nemarshanski Sad (Belarusian: Немаршанскі Сад, Russian: Неморшанский Сад, Nemorshansky Sad) is a Minsk Metro station on Zelenaluzhskaya line. It was opened on 30 December 2024 by Alexander Lukashenko as a part of three-station extension of the line from Kavalskaya Slabada to Slutski Hastsinets. The adjacent stations are Aeradromnaya and Slutski Hastsinets.
