= Ploshcha Pyeramohi (Minsk Metro) =

Minsk Metro station

Ploshcha Pyeramohi Плошча Перамогі
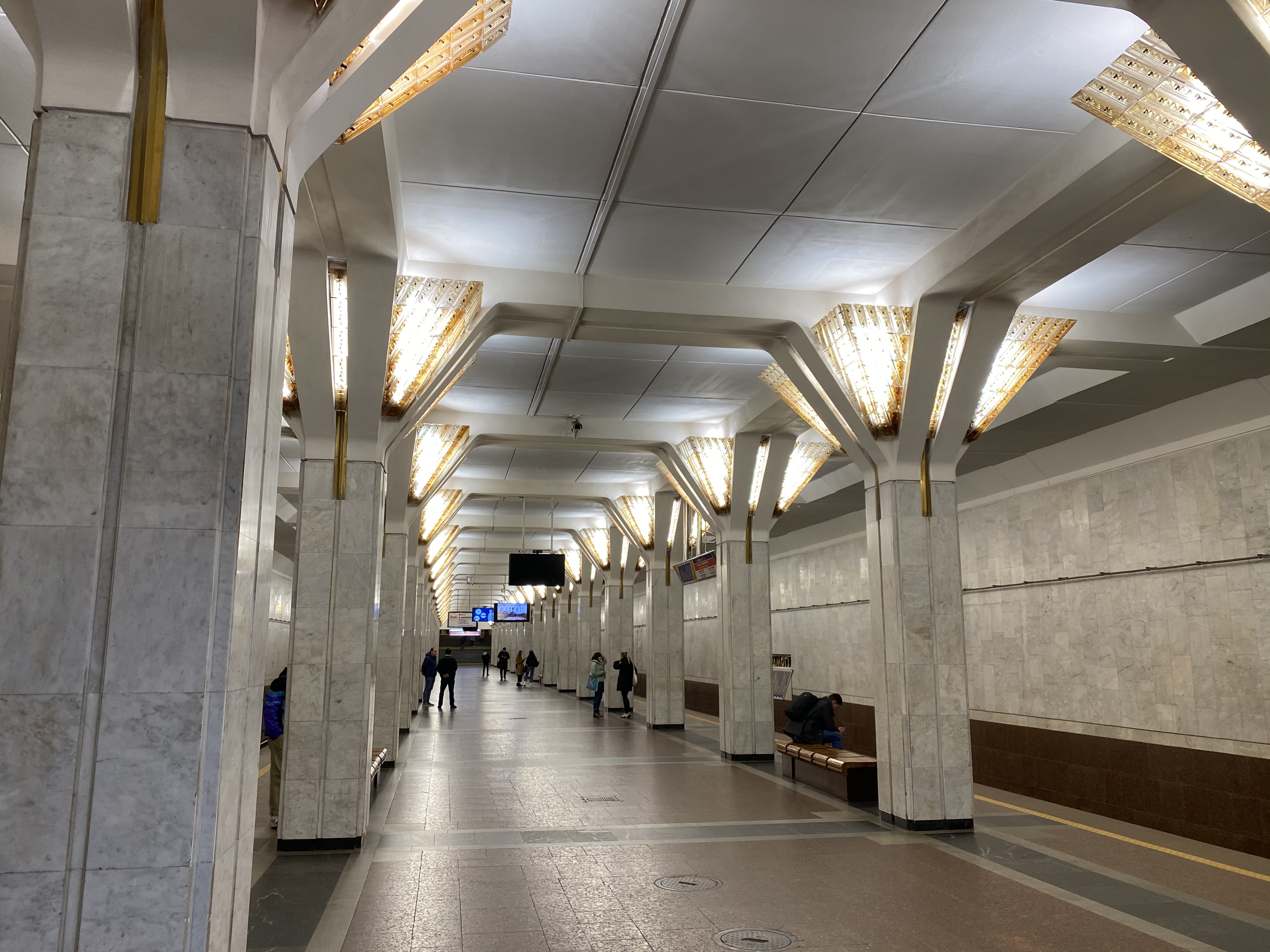
- Station Hall

General information
- Coordinates: 53.9093°N 27.5759°E
- System: Minsk Metro
- Owner: Minsk Metro
- Line: Maskoŭskaja line
- Platforms: 1 island platform
- Tracks: 2

Construction
- Structure type: Underground

Other information
- Station code: 117

History
- Opened: 26 June 1984; 42 years ago

Services
Preceding station	Minsk Metro	Following station
Ploshcha Yakuba Kolasa towards Uručča	Maskoŭskaja line	Kastrychnitskaya towards Malinawka
Location
- Location within Belarus

Ploshcha Pyeramohi (Belarusian: Плошча Перамогі; Russian: Площадь Победы) is a Minsk Metro station. Opened on June 26, 1984.

== Photogallery ==
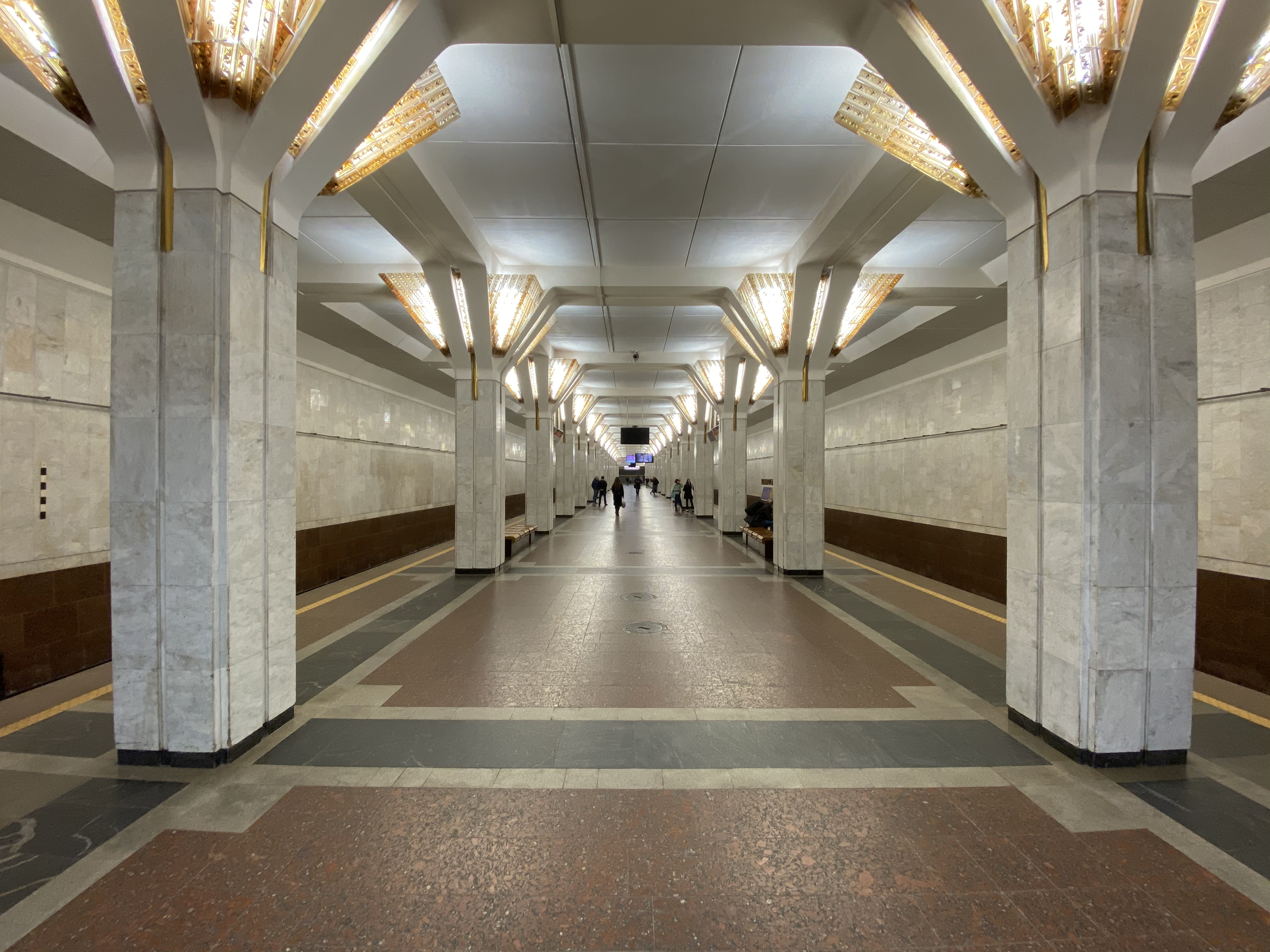

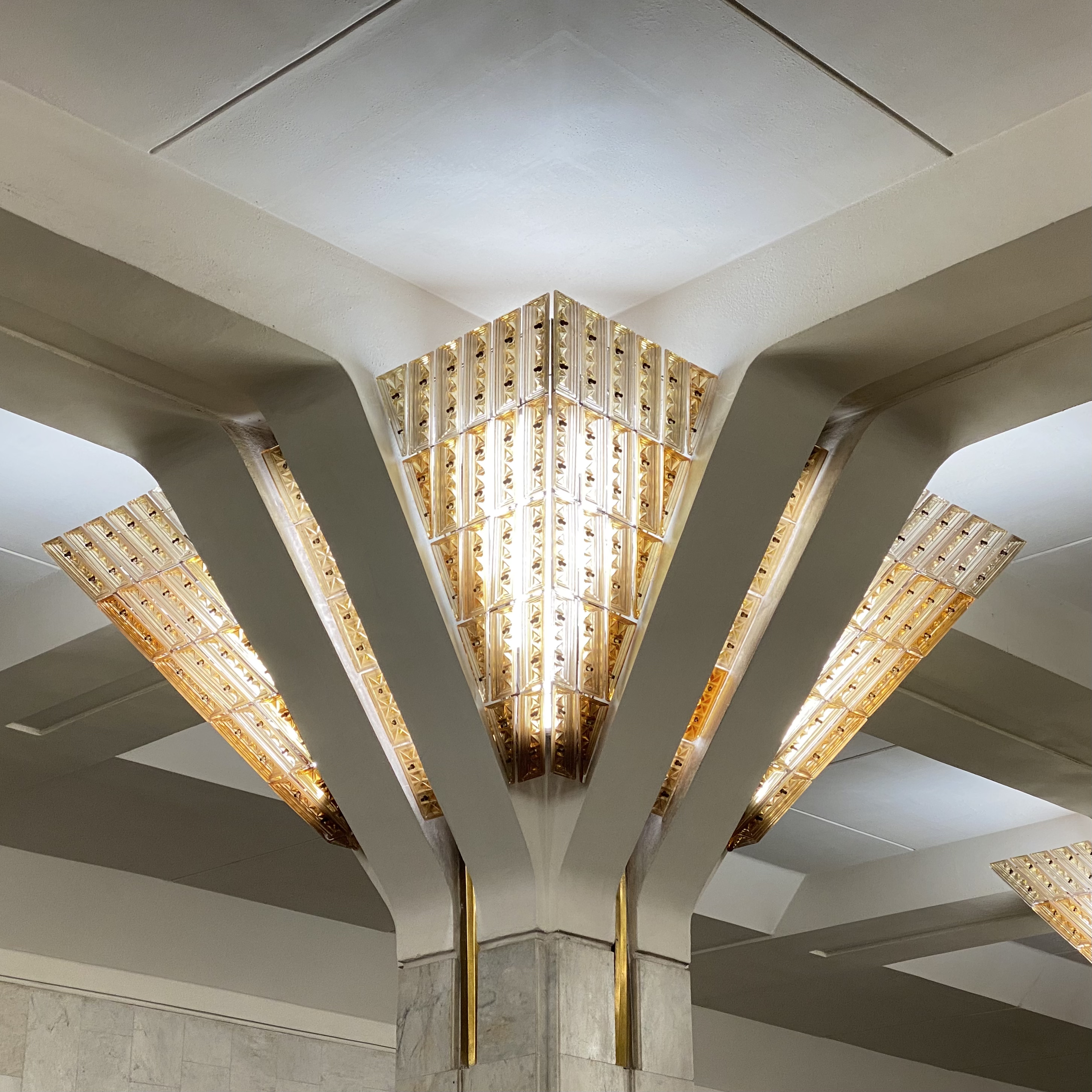

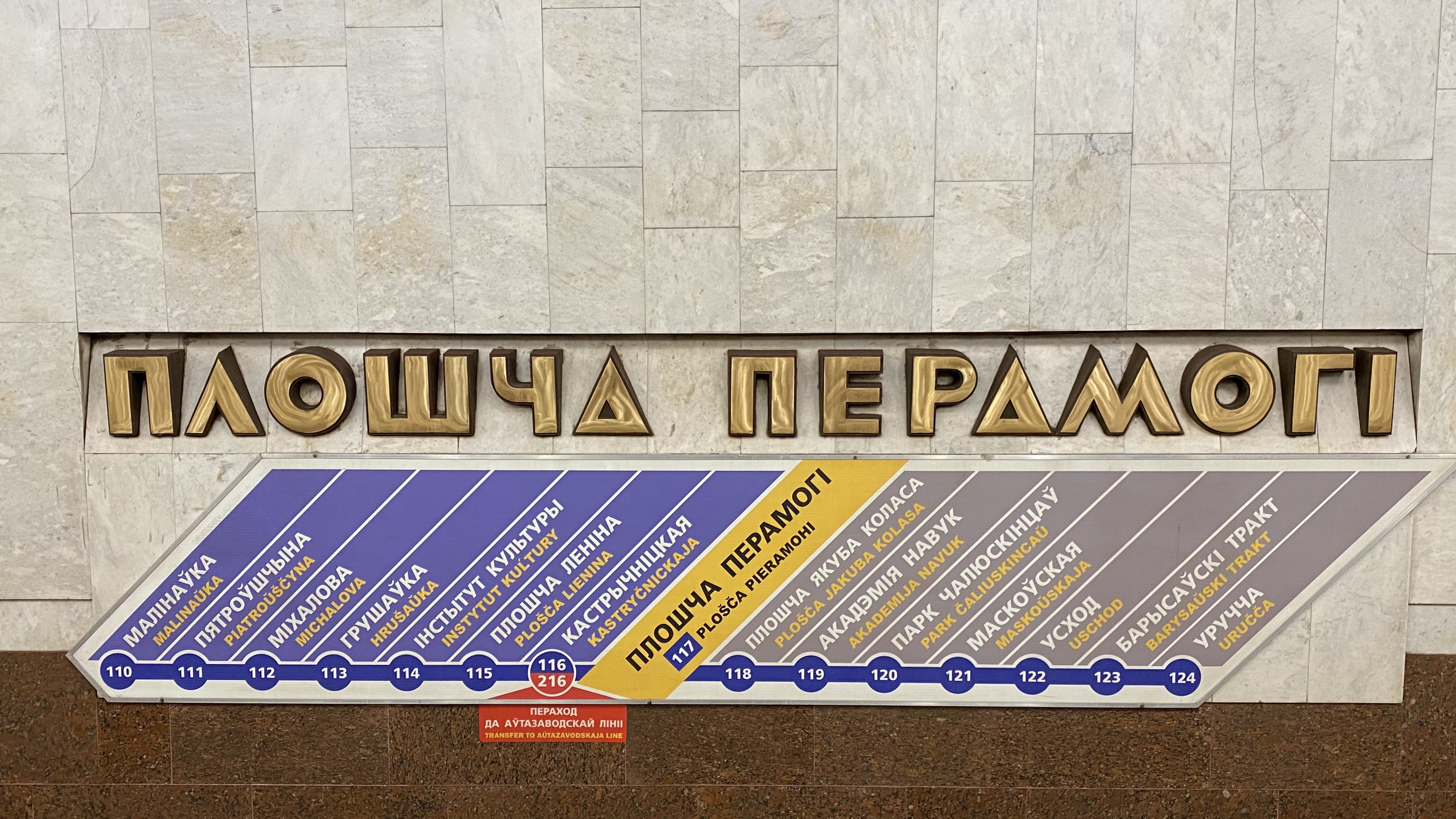

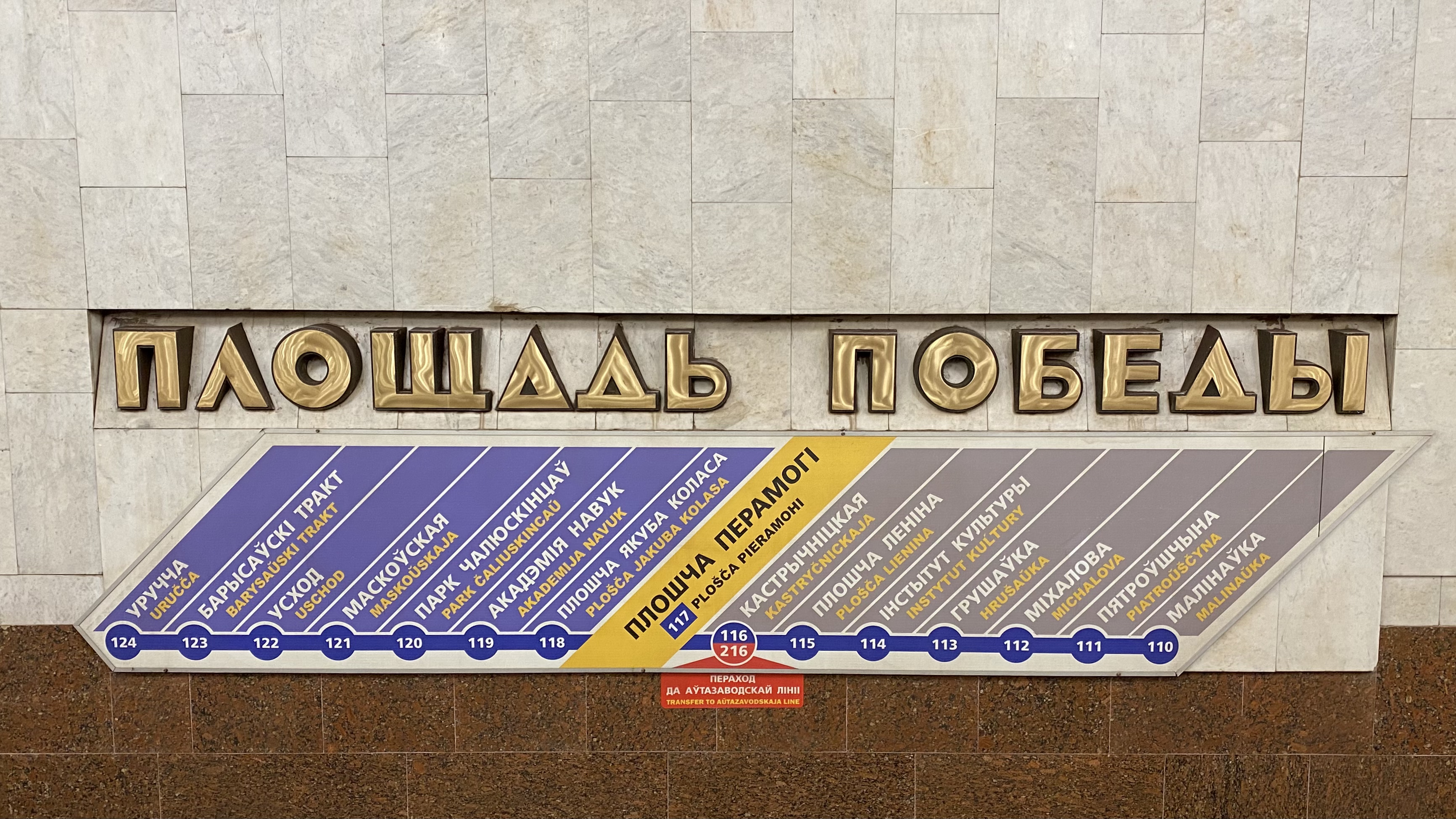

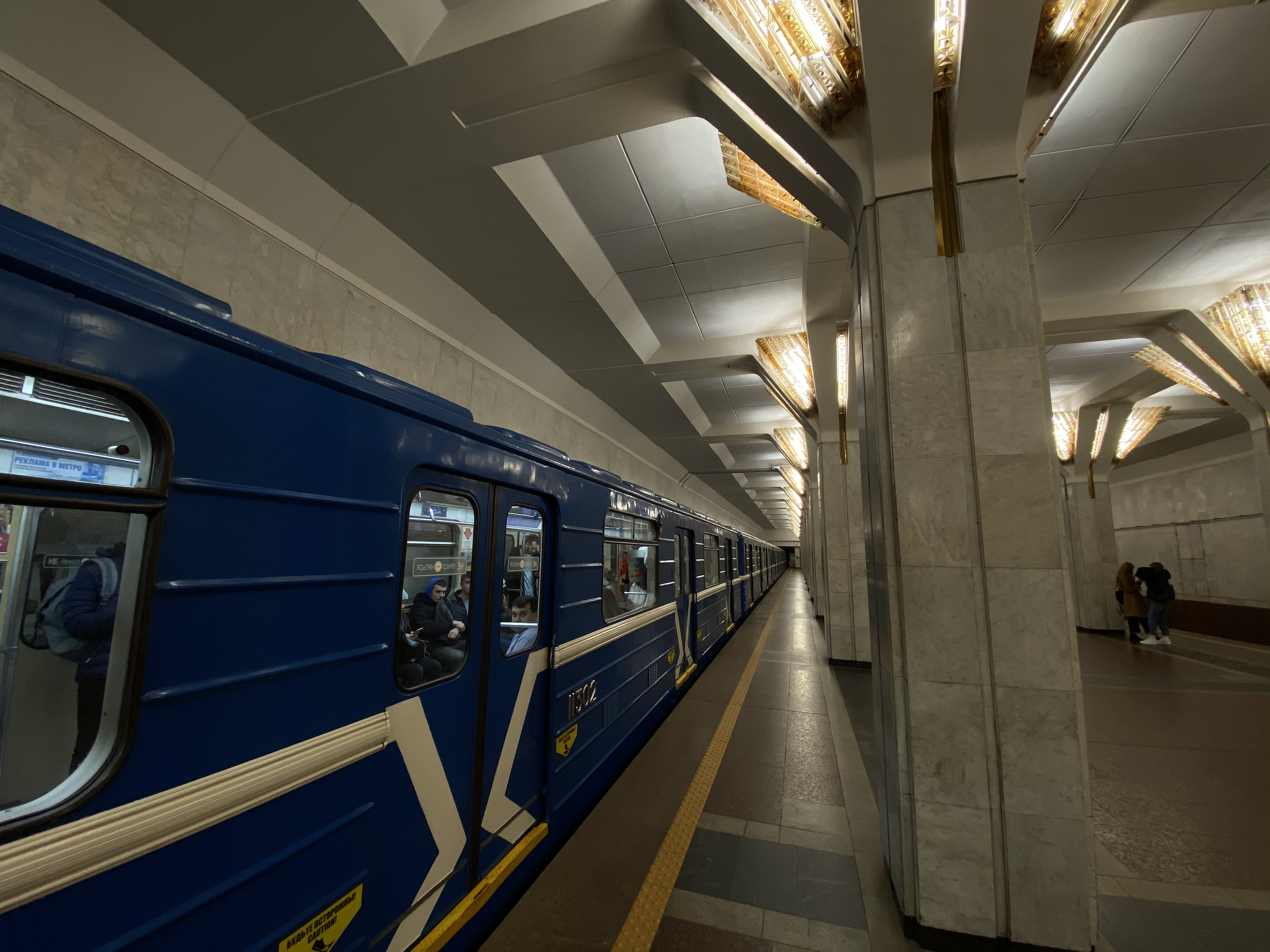

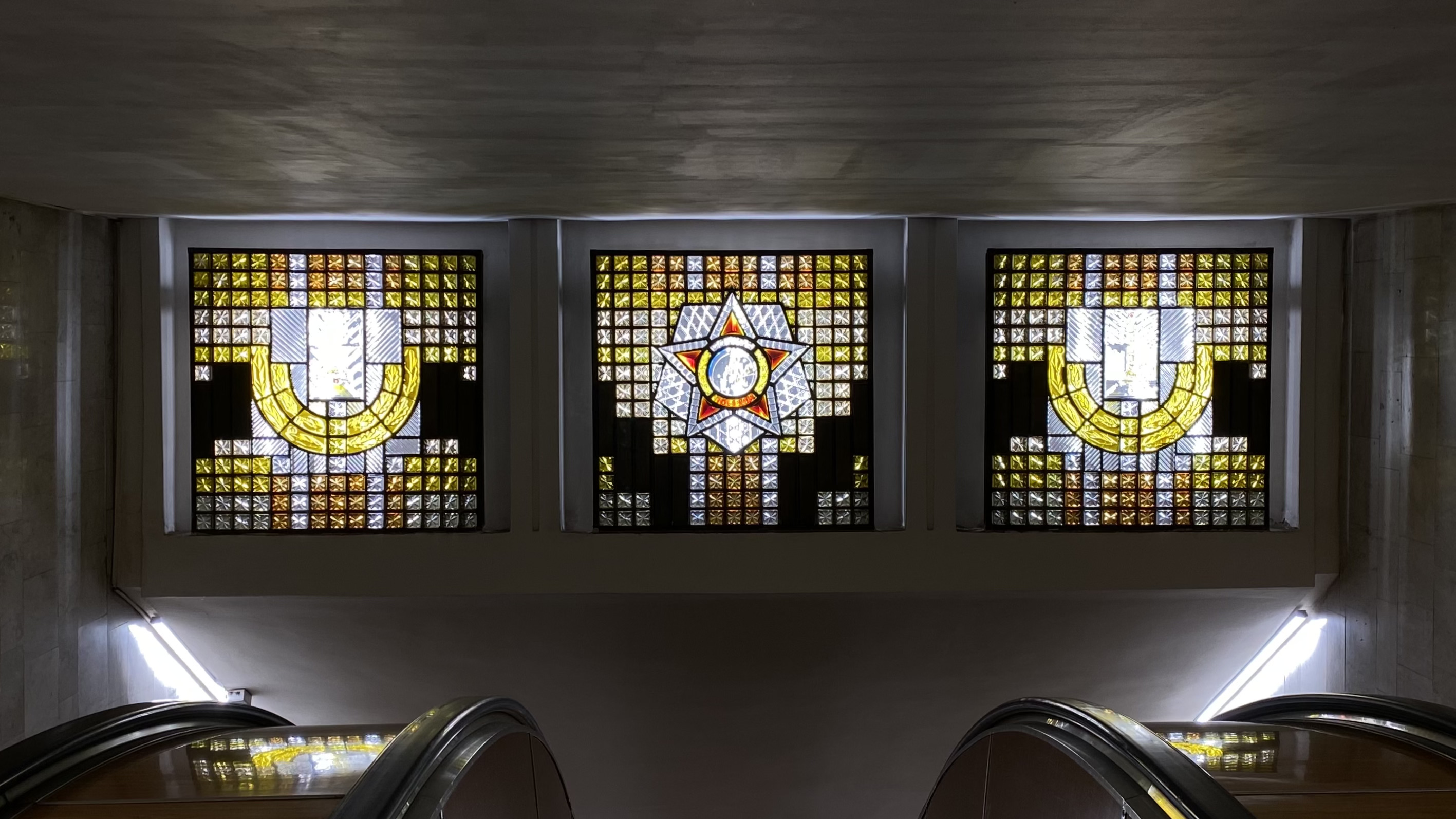

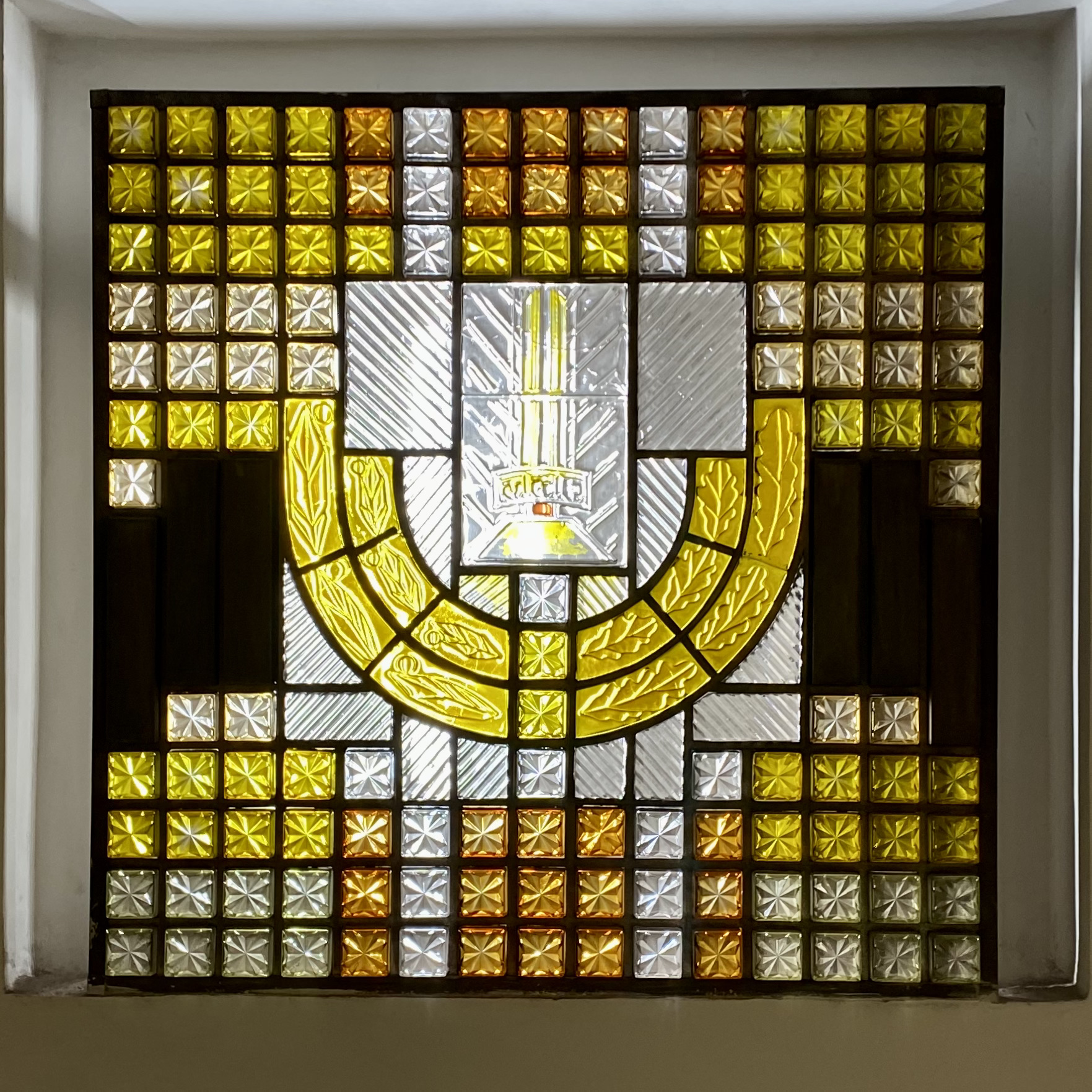

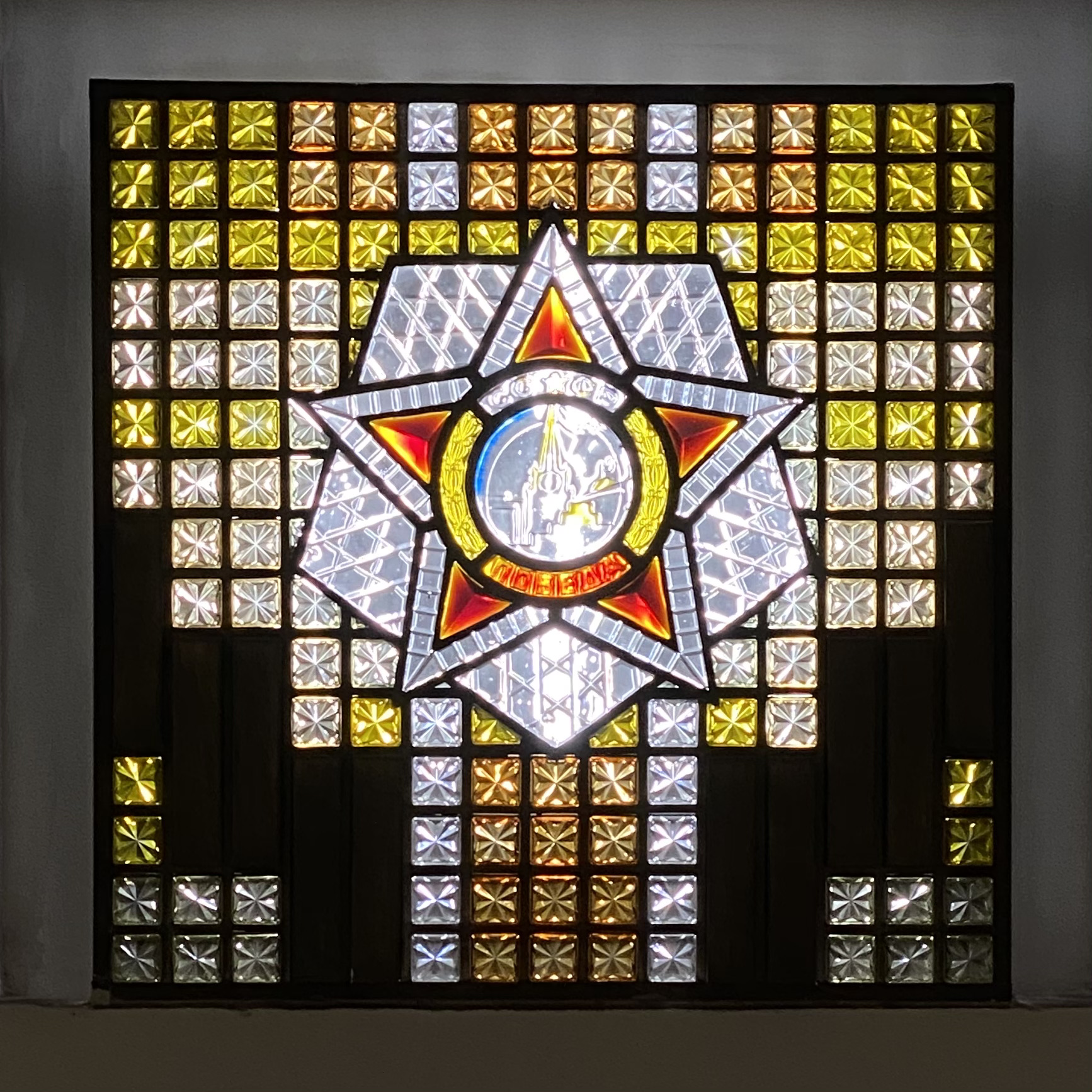

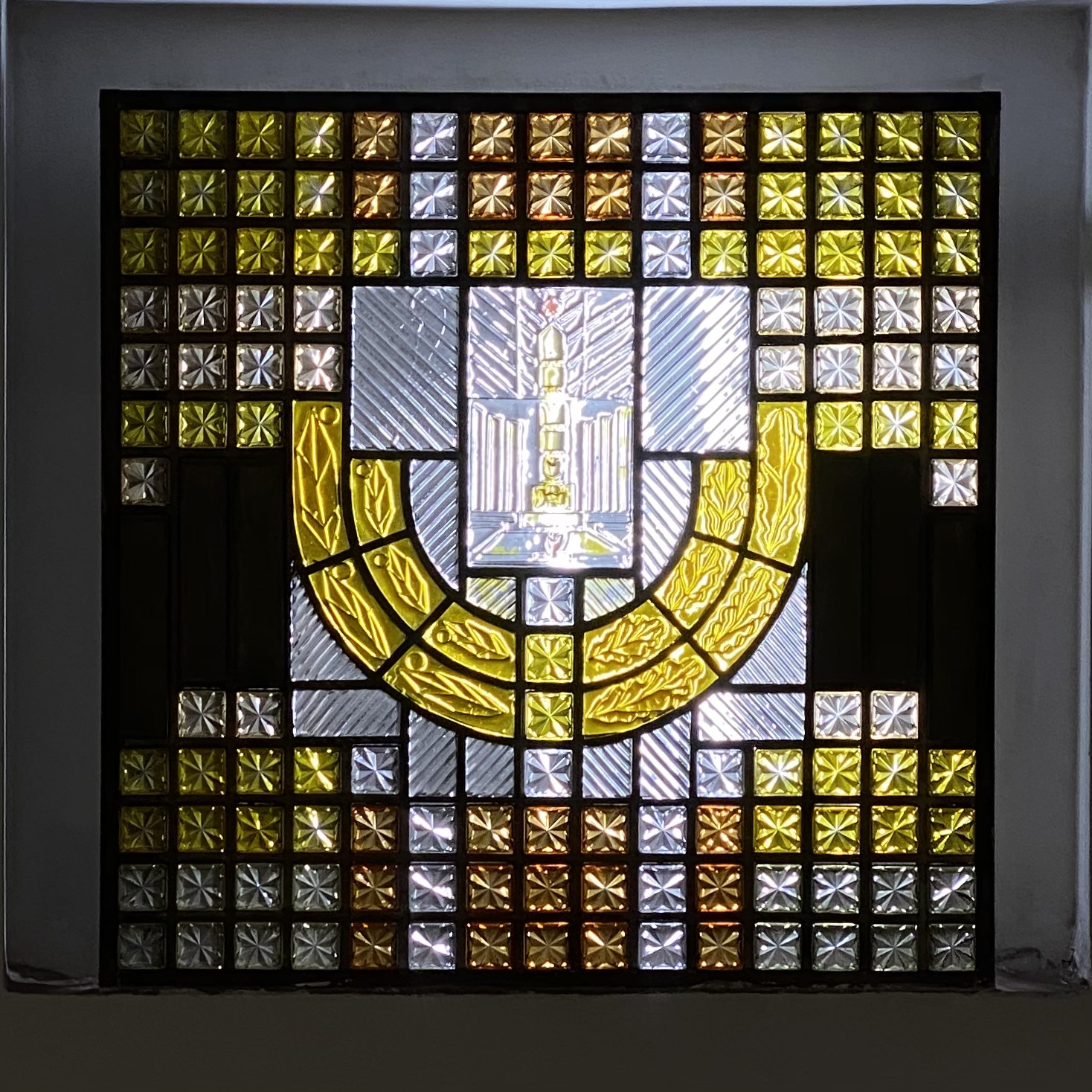

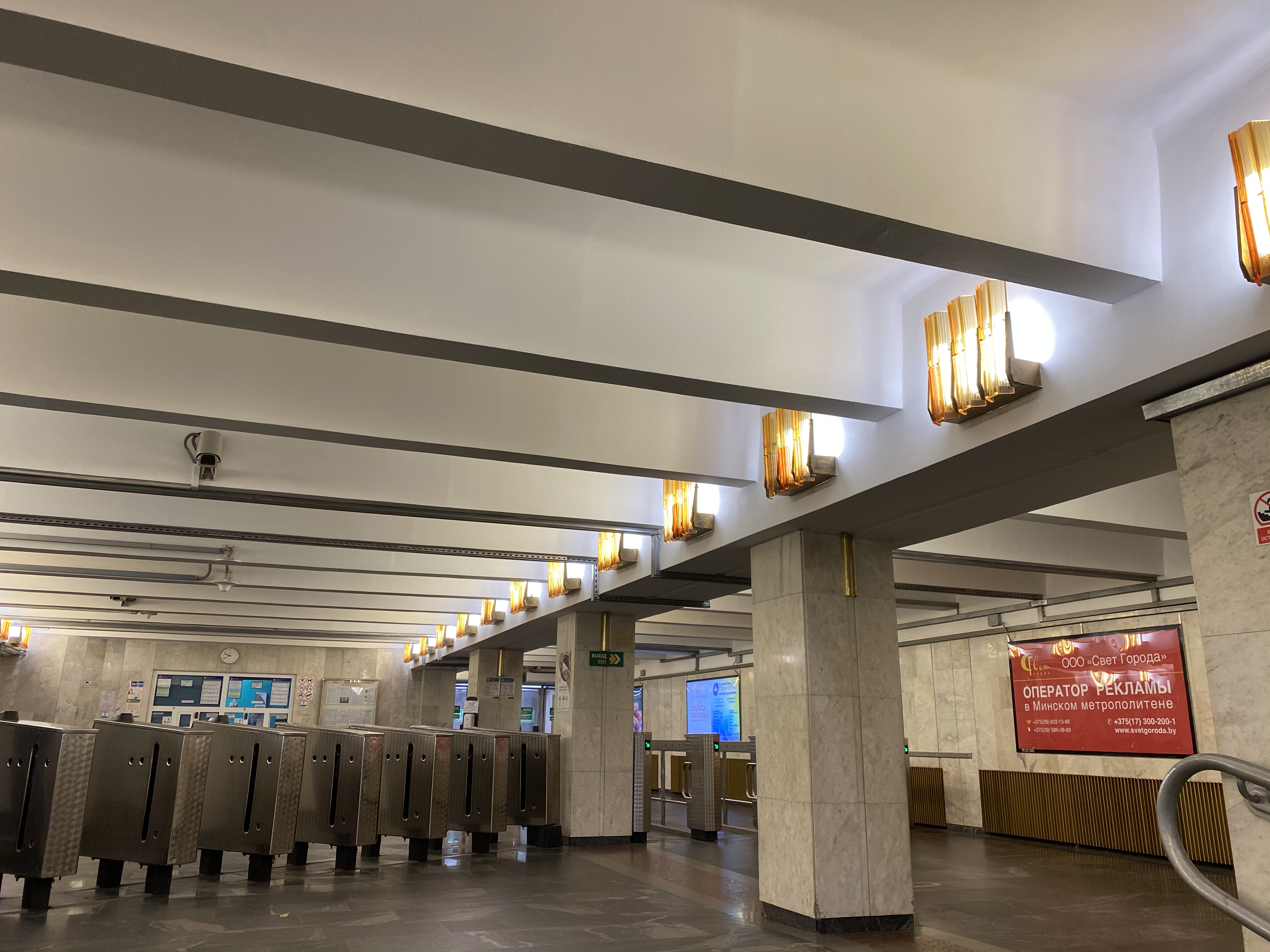

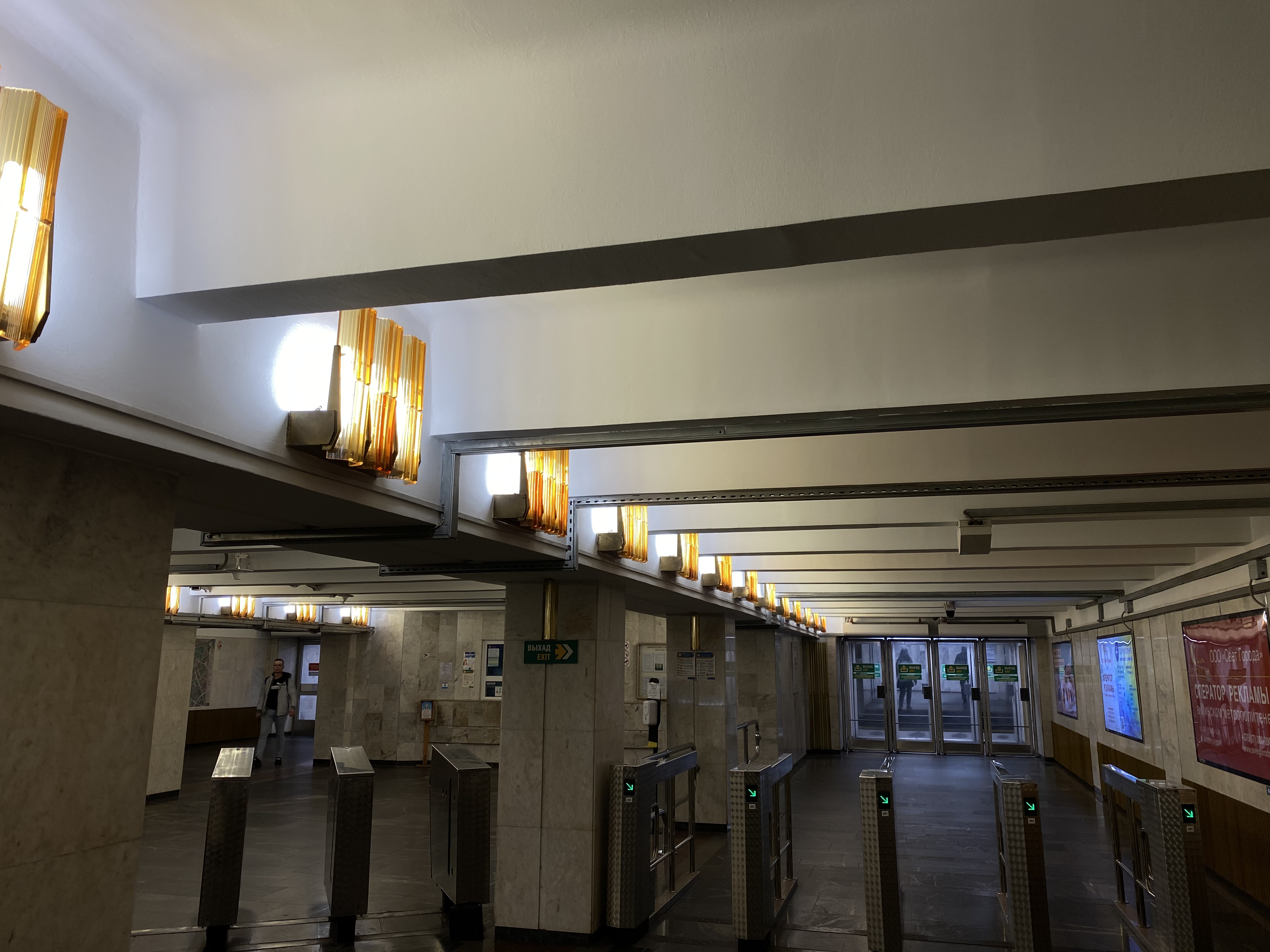

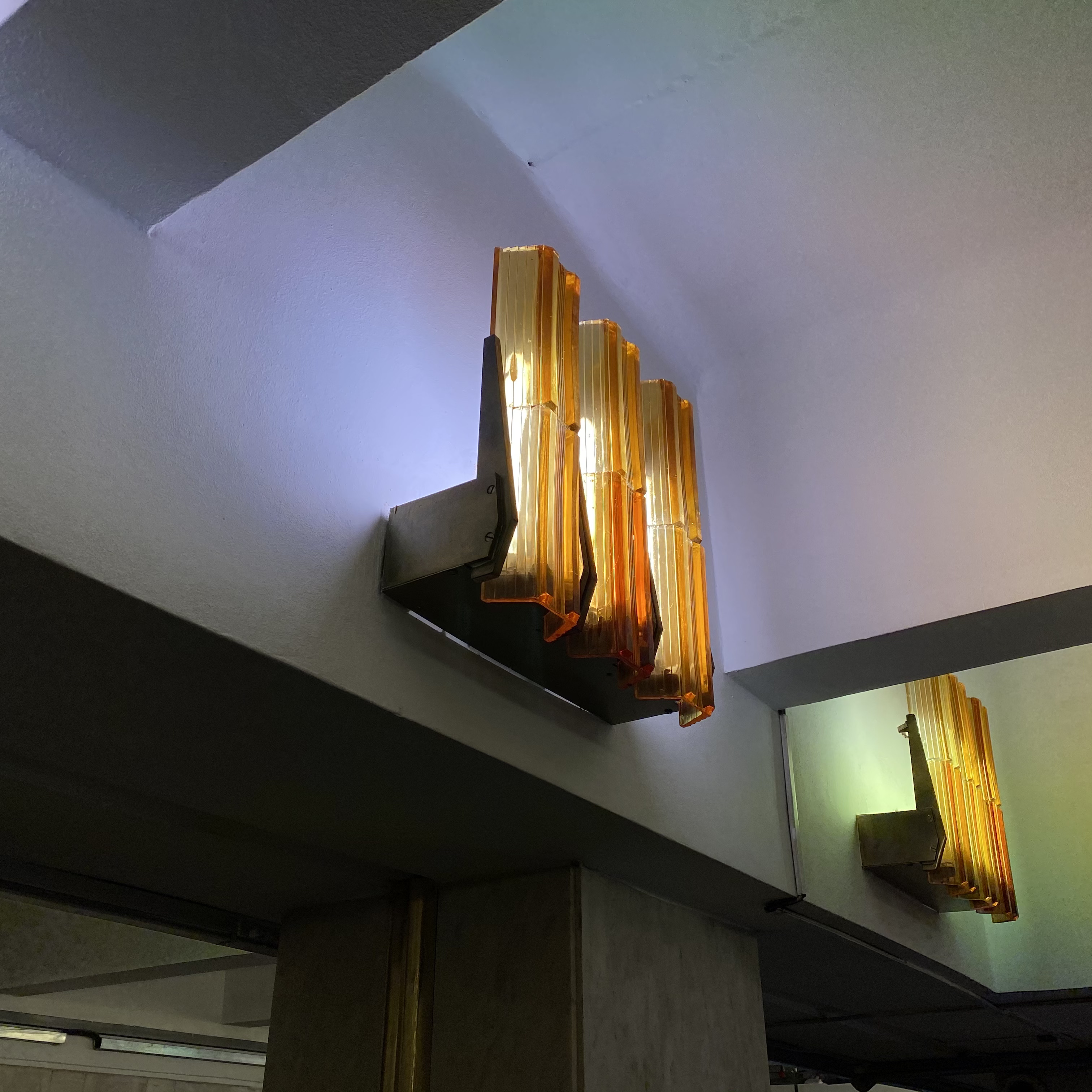

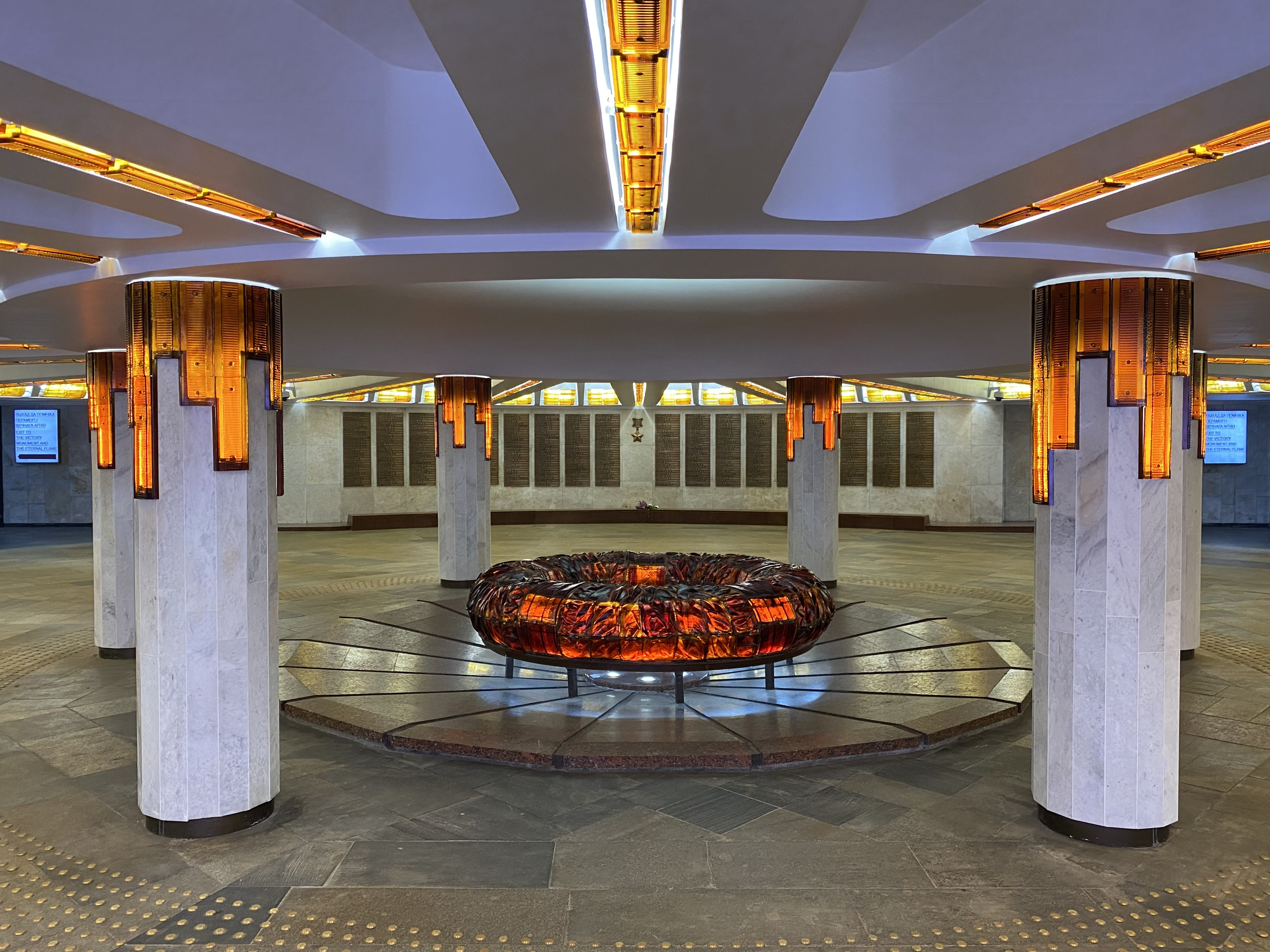

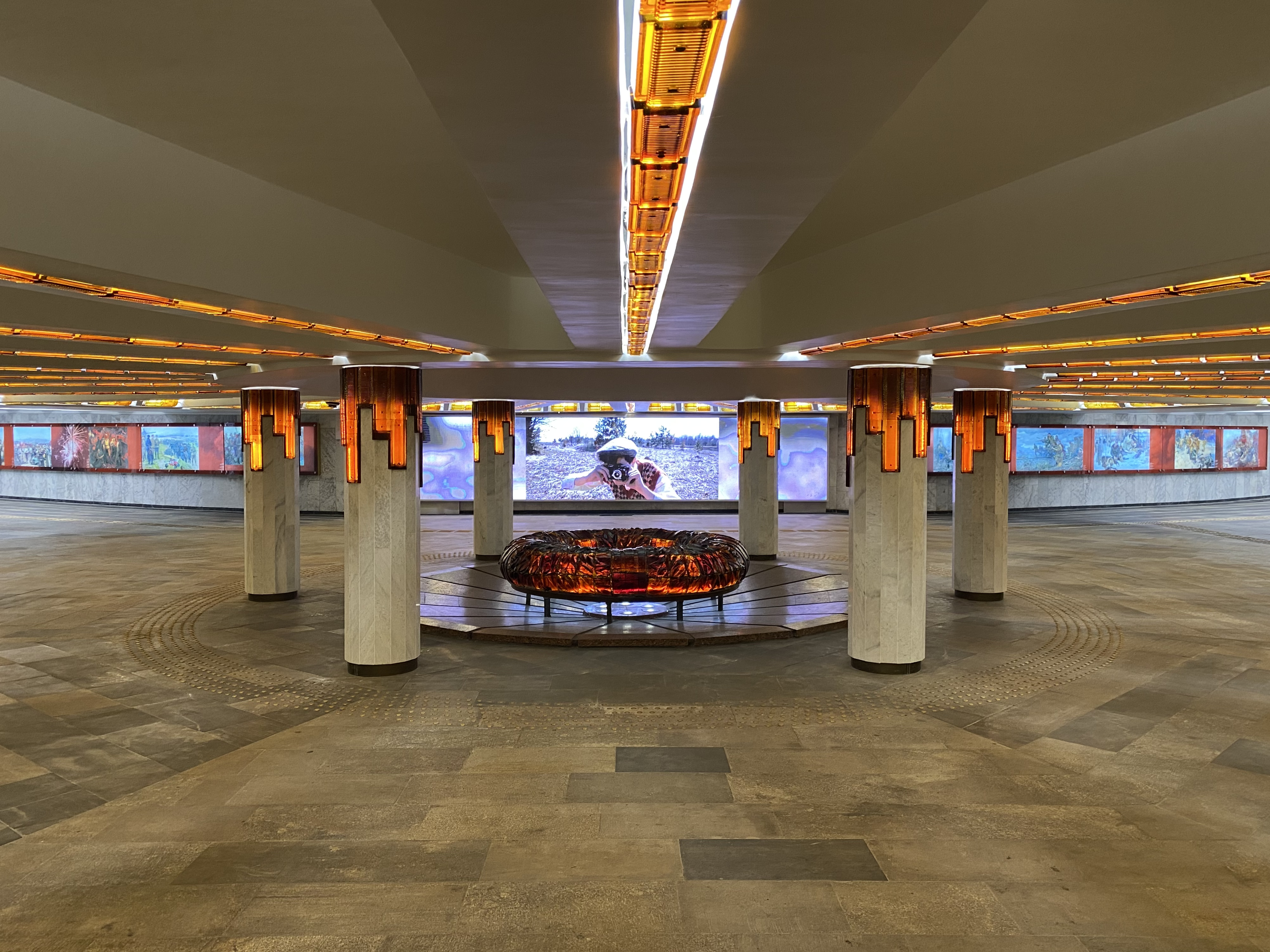

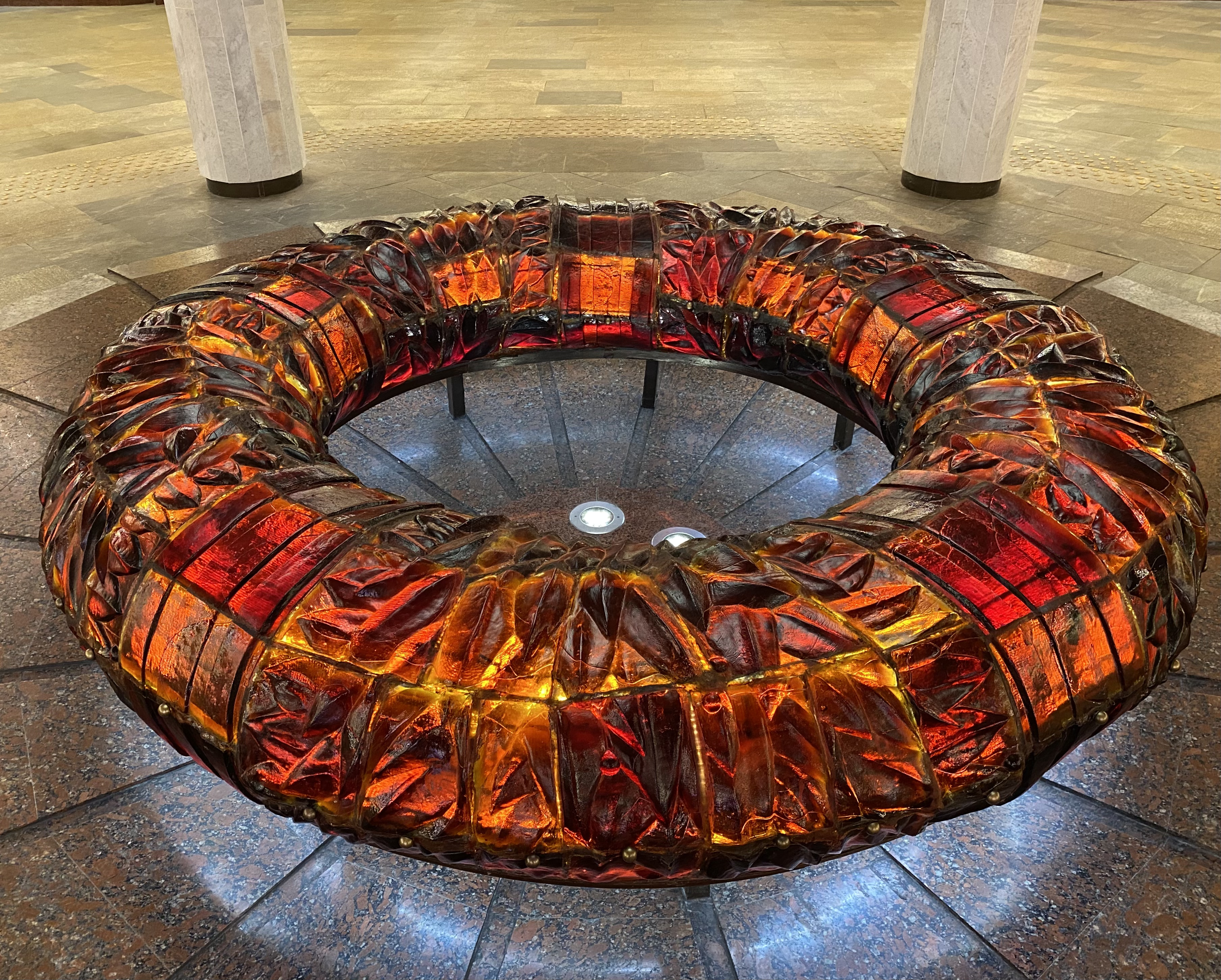

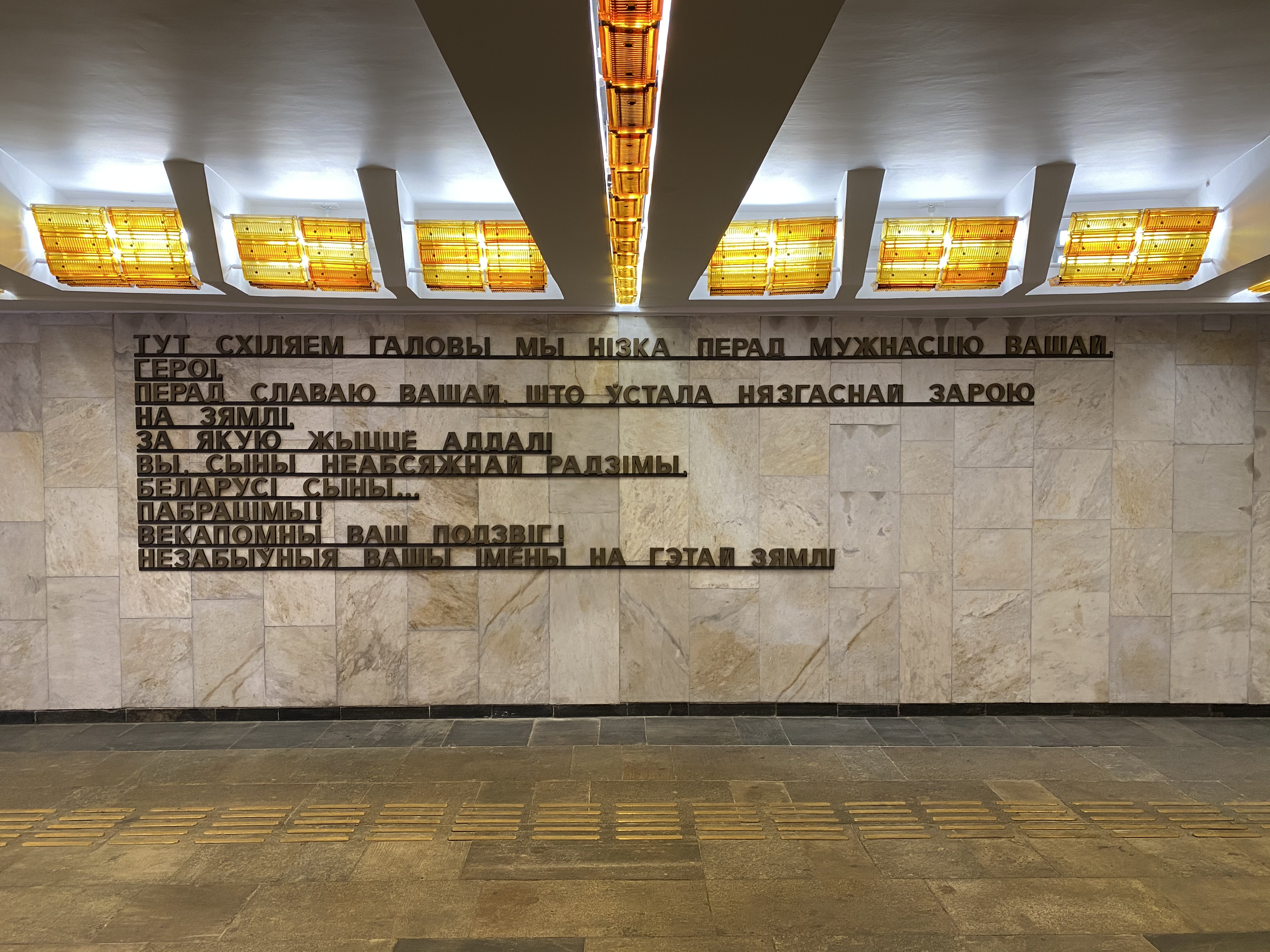

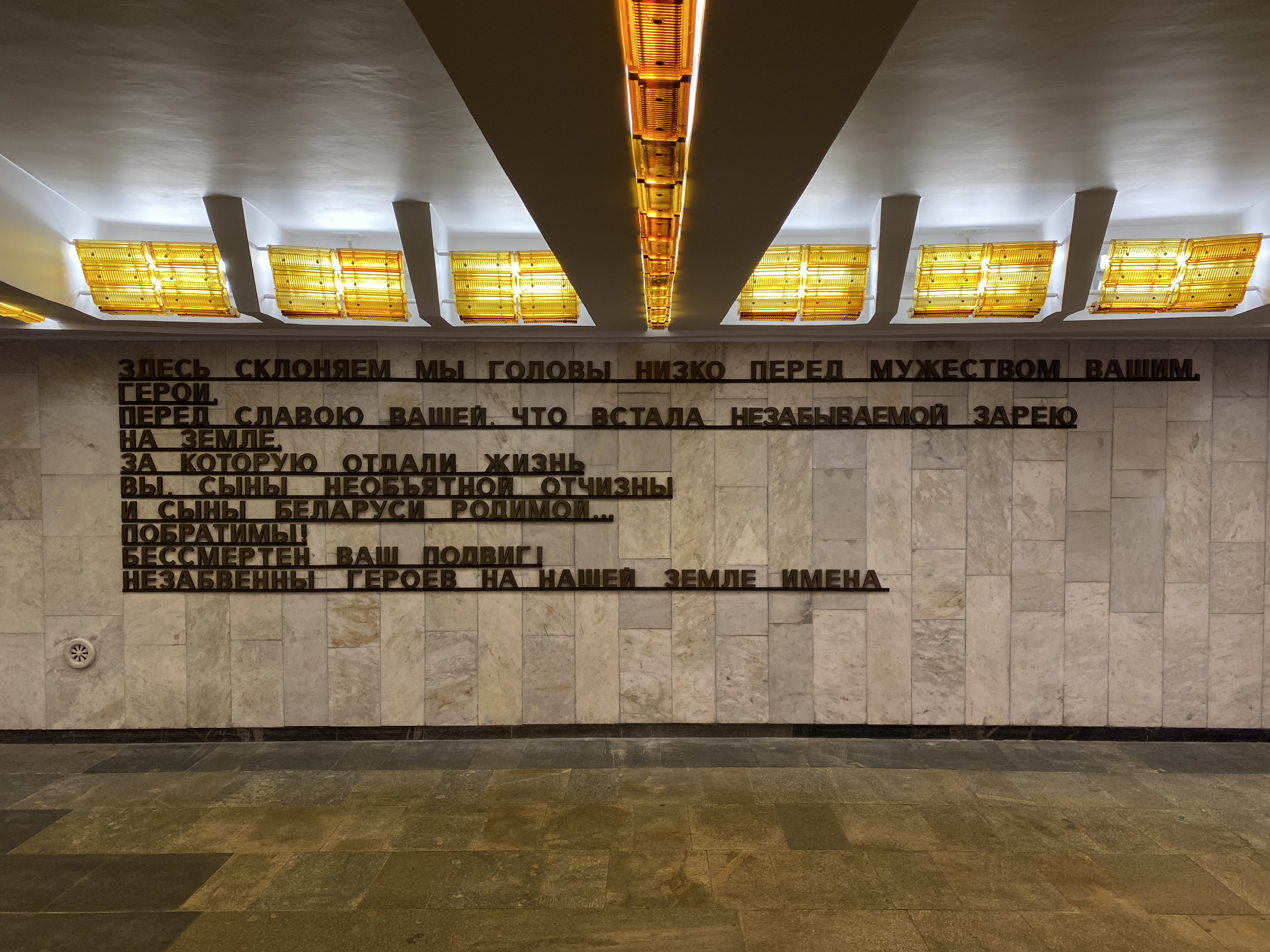

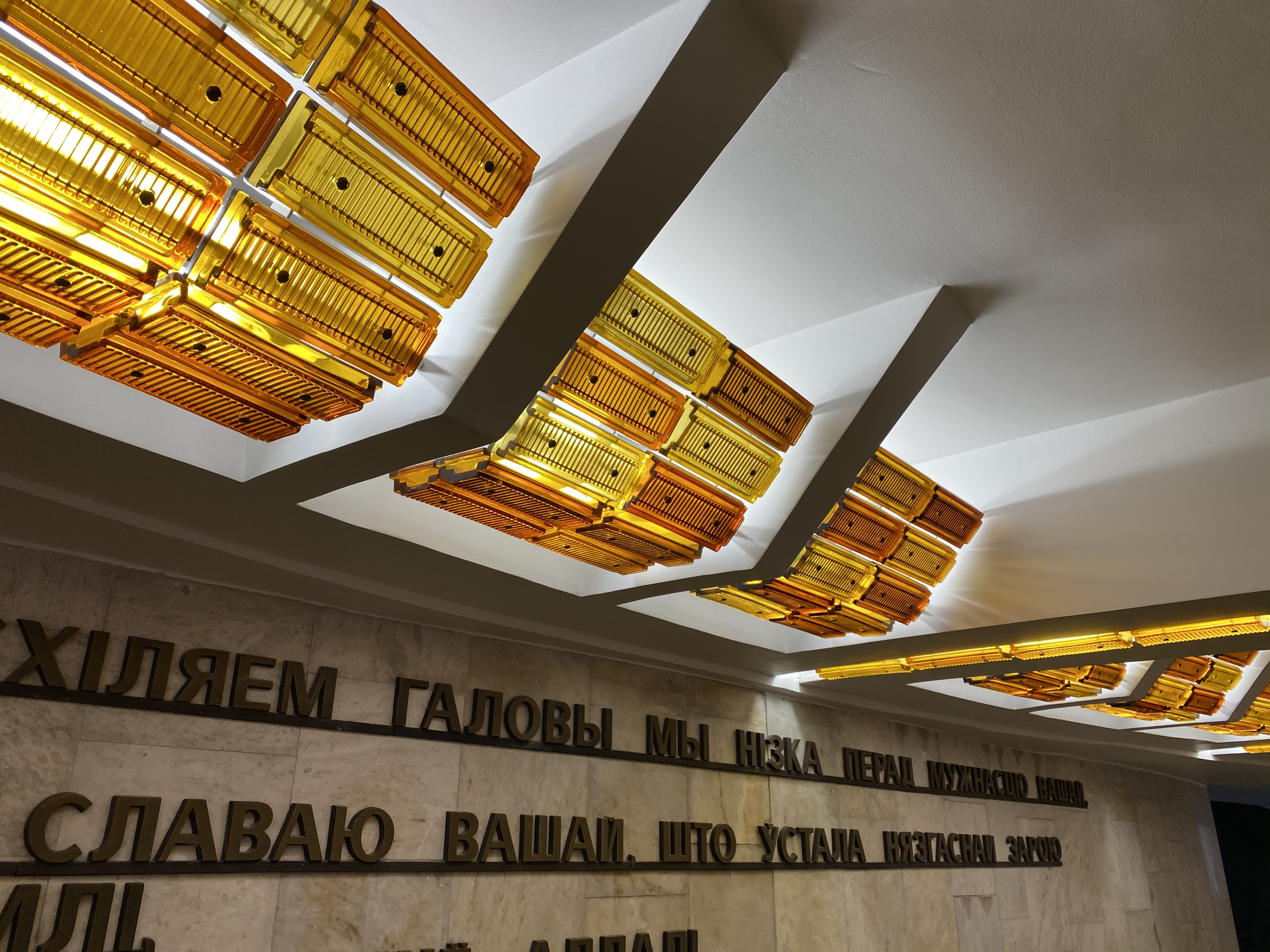

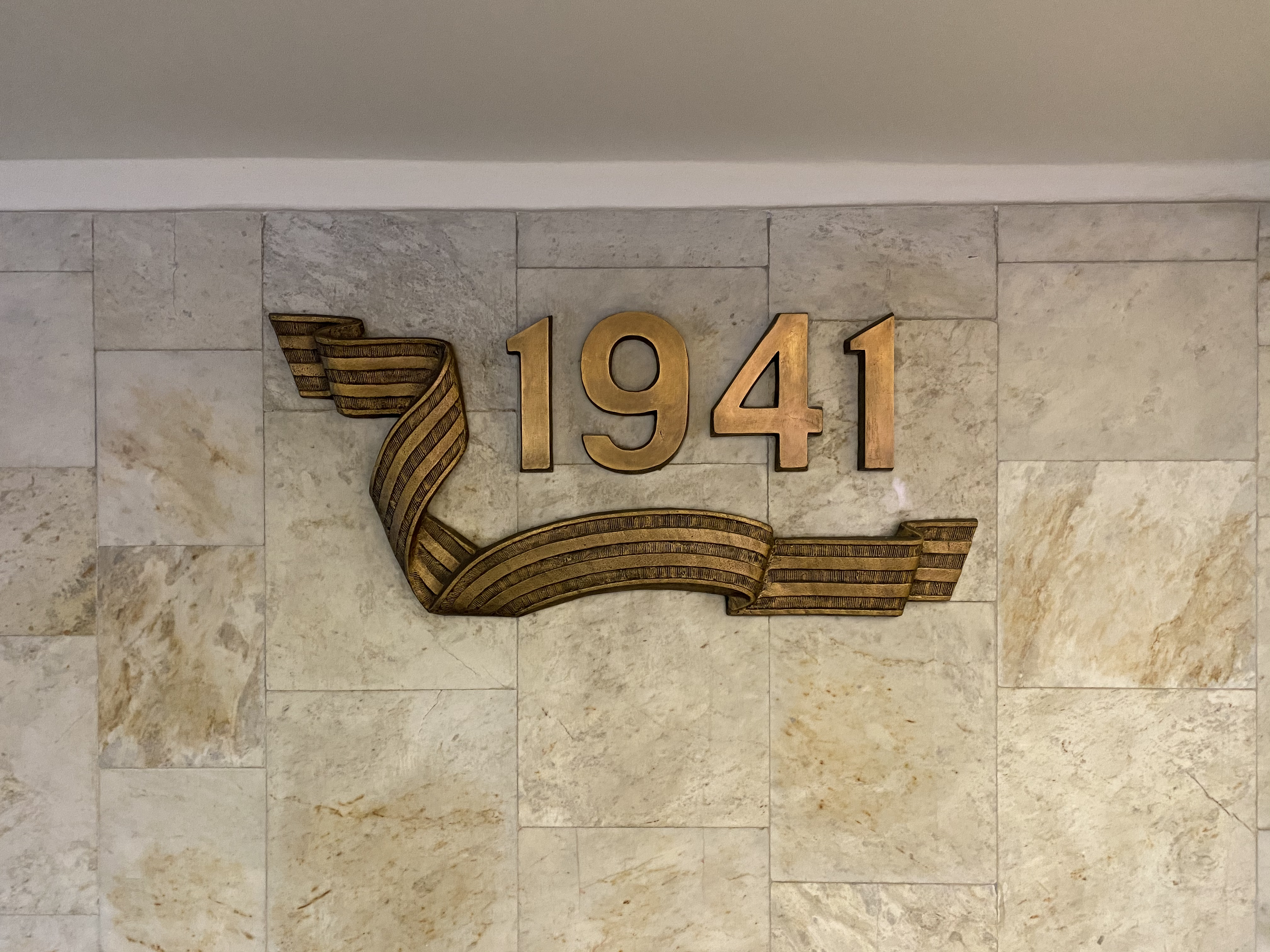

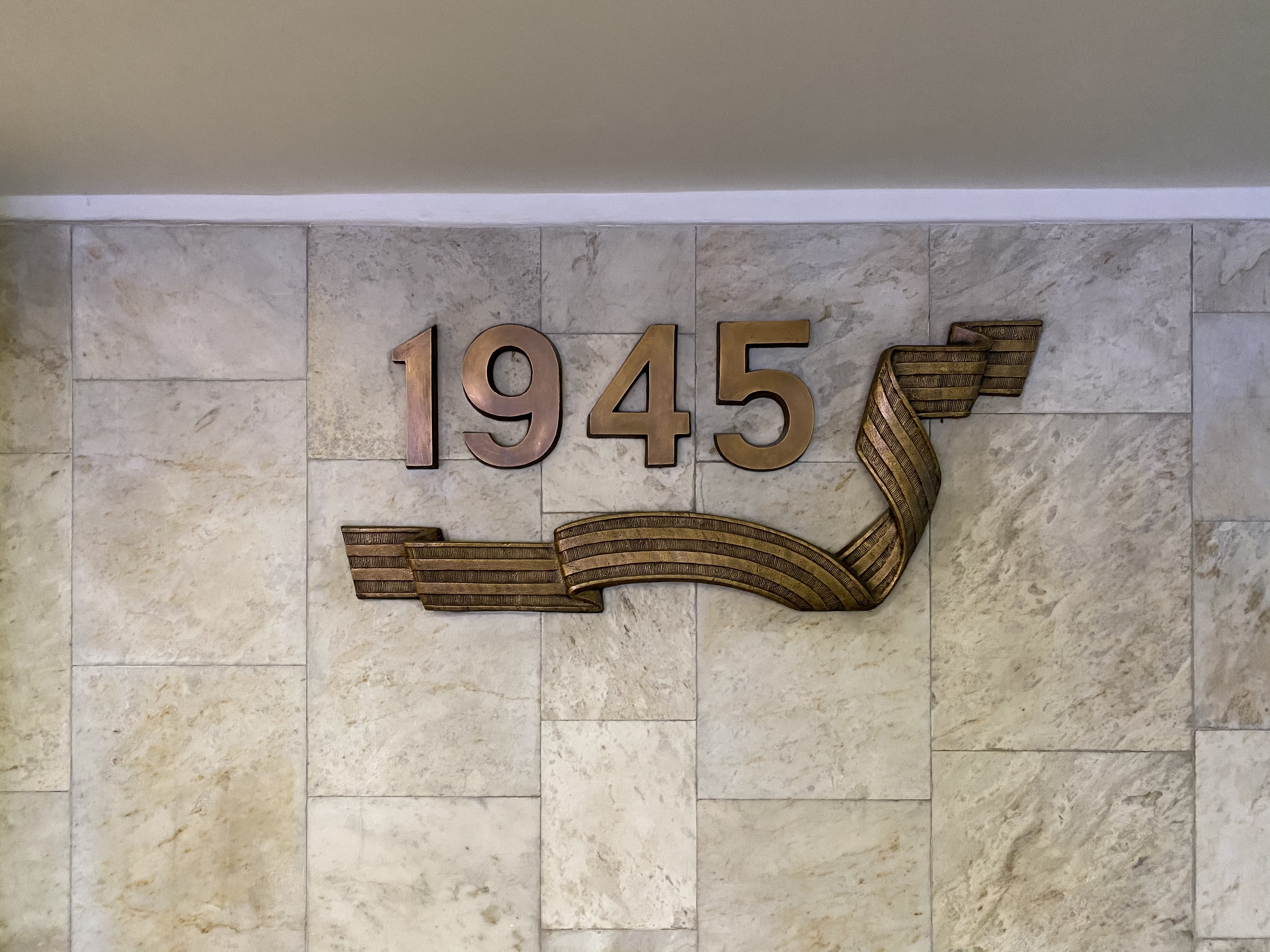

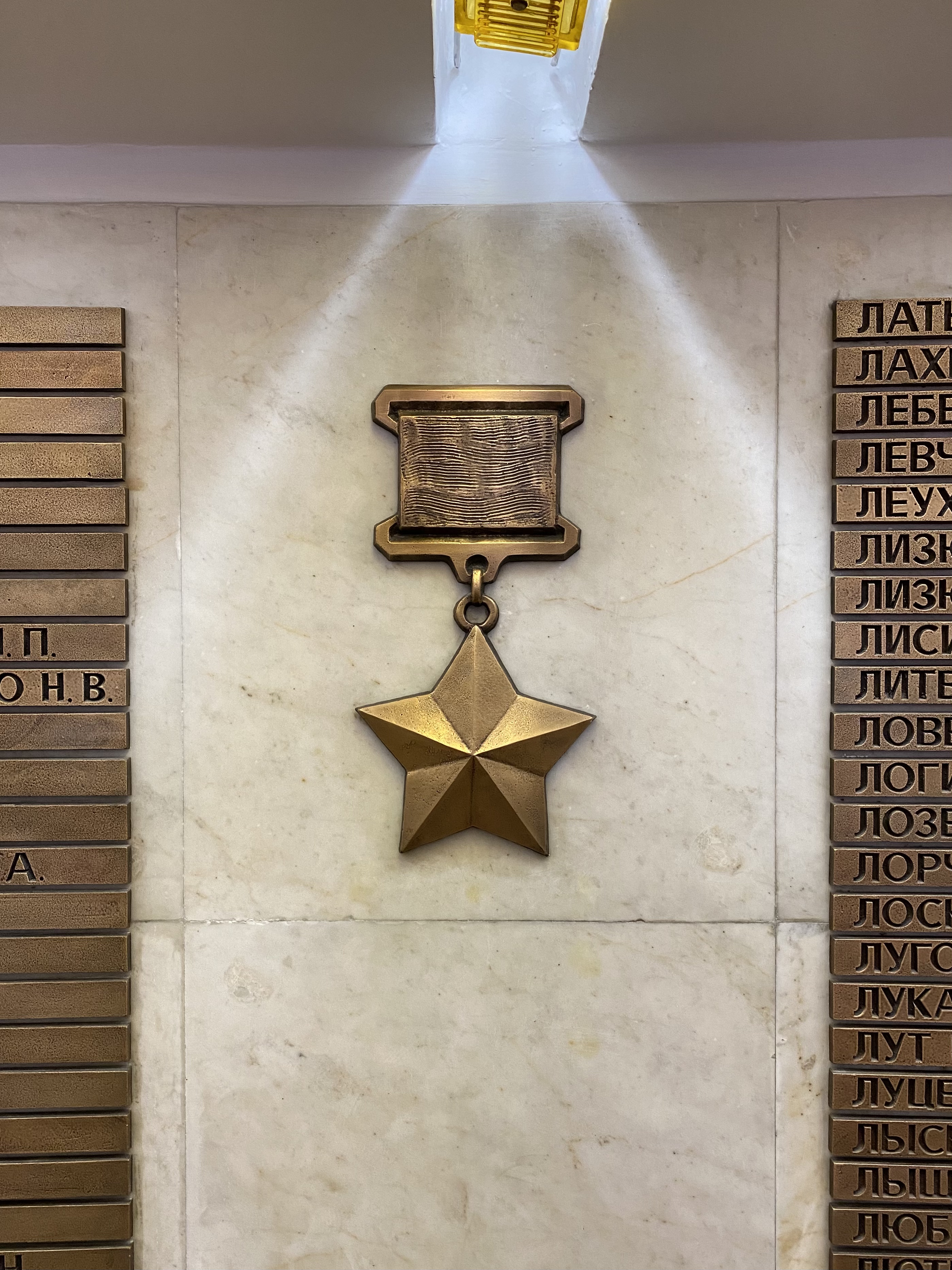

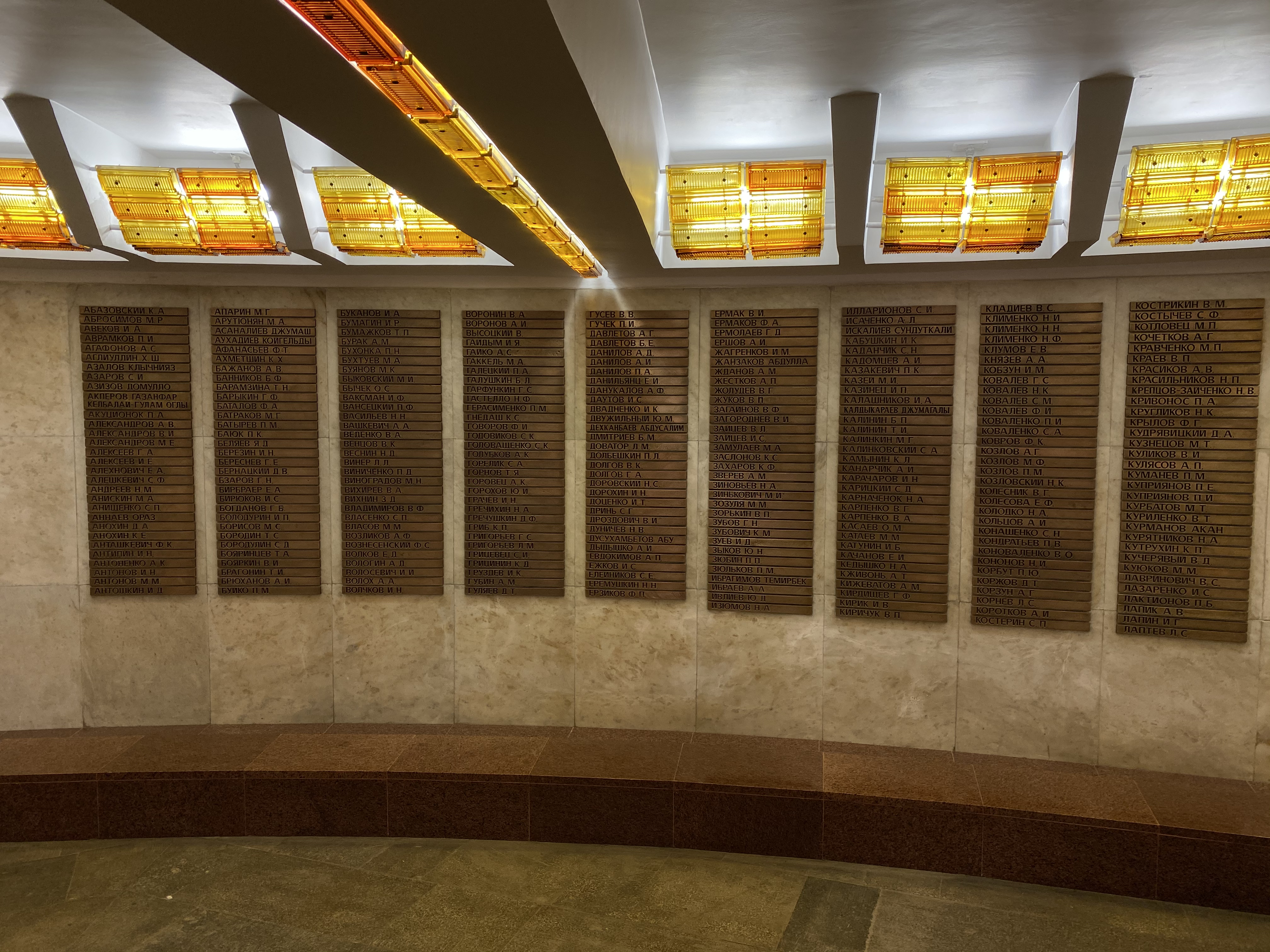

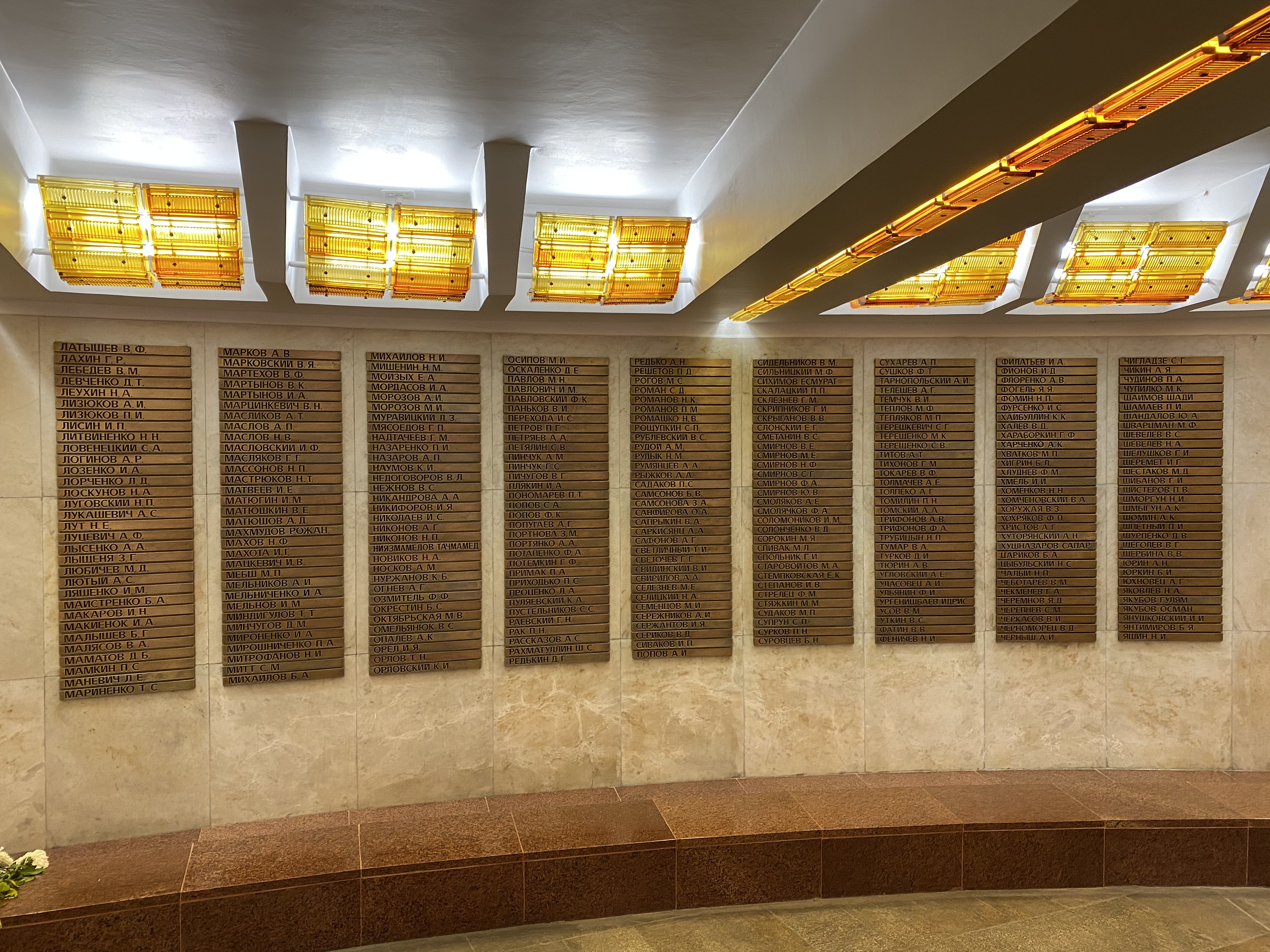

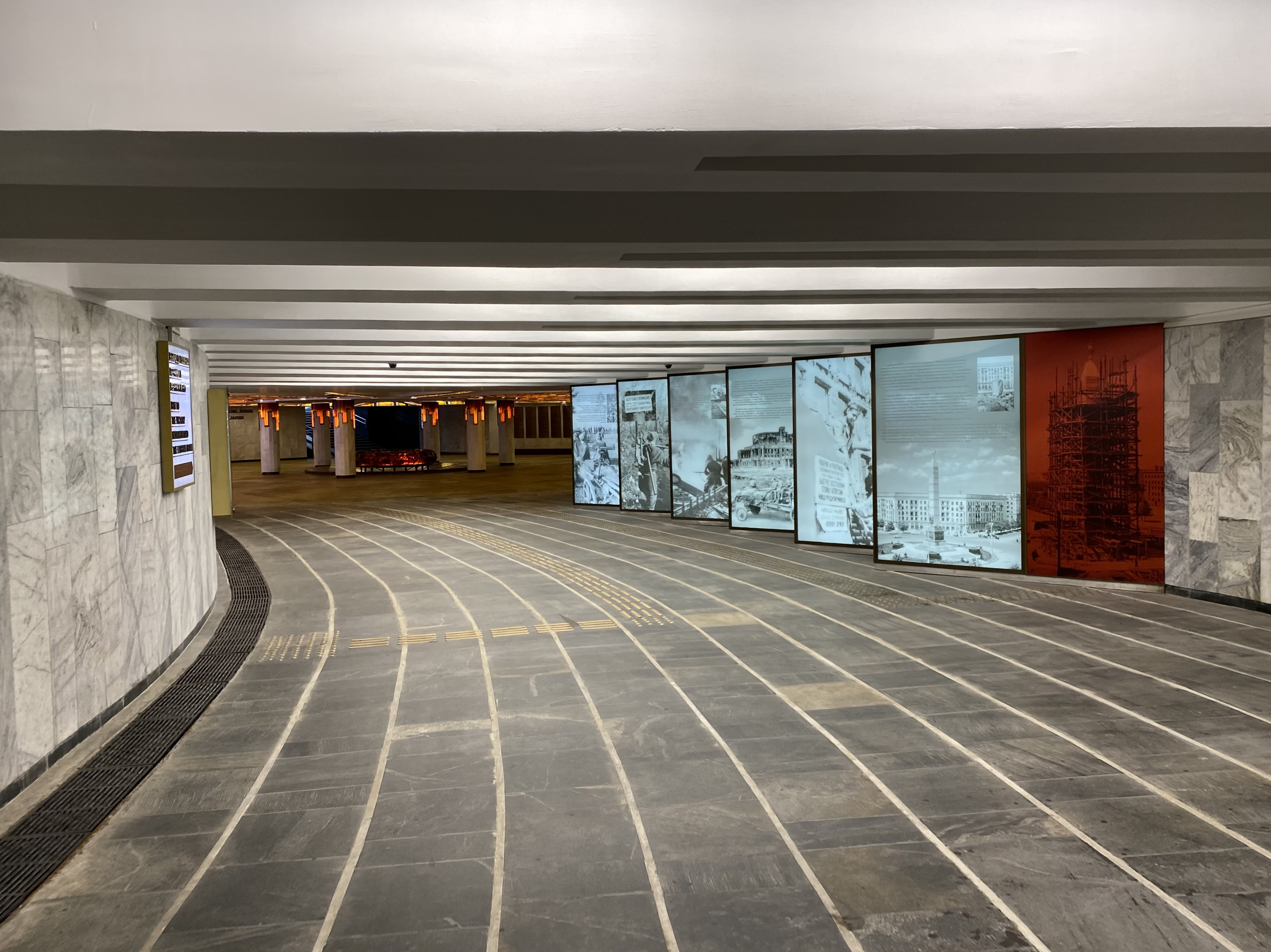

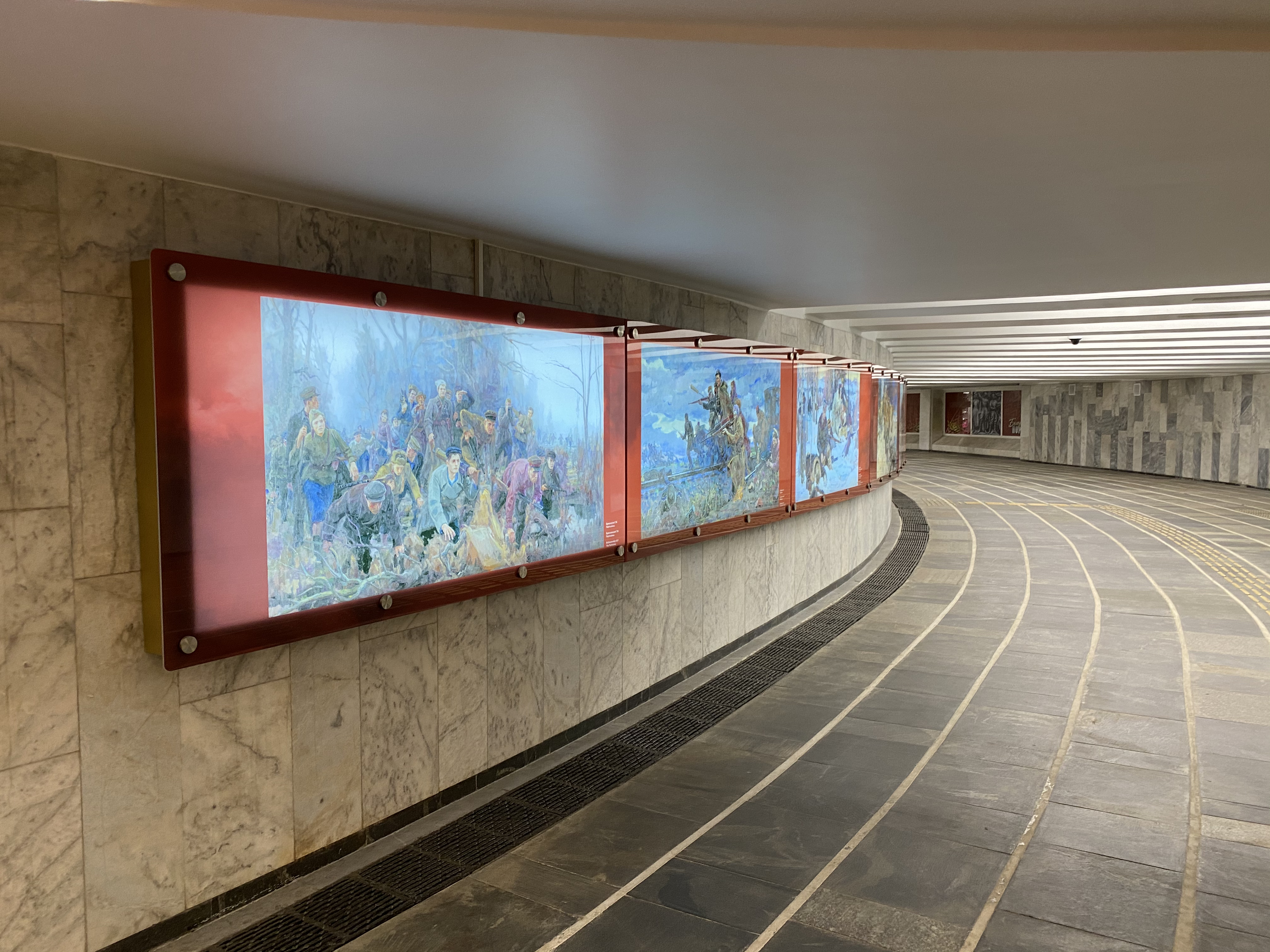

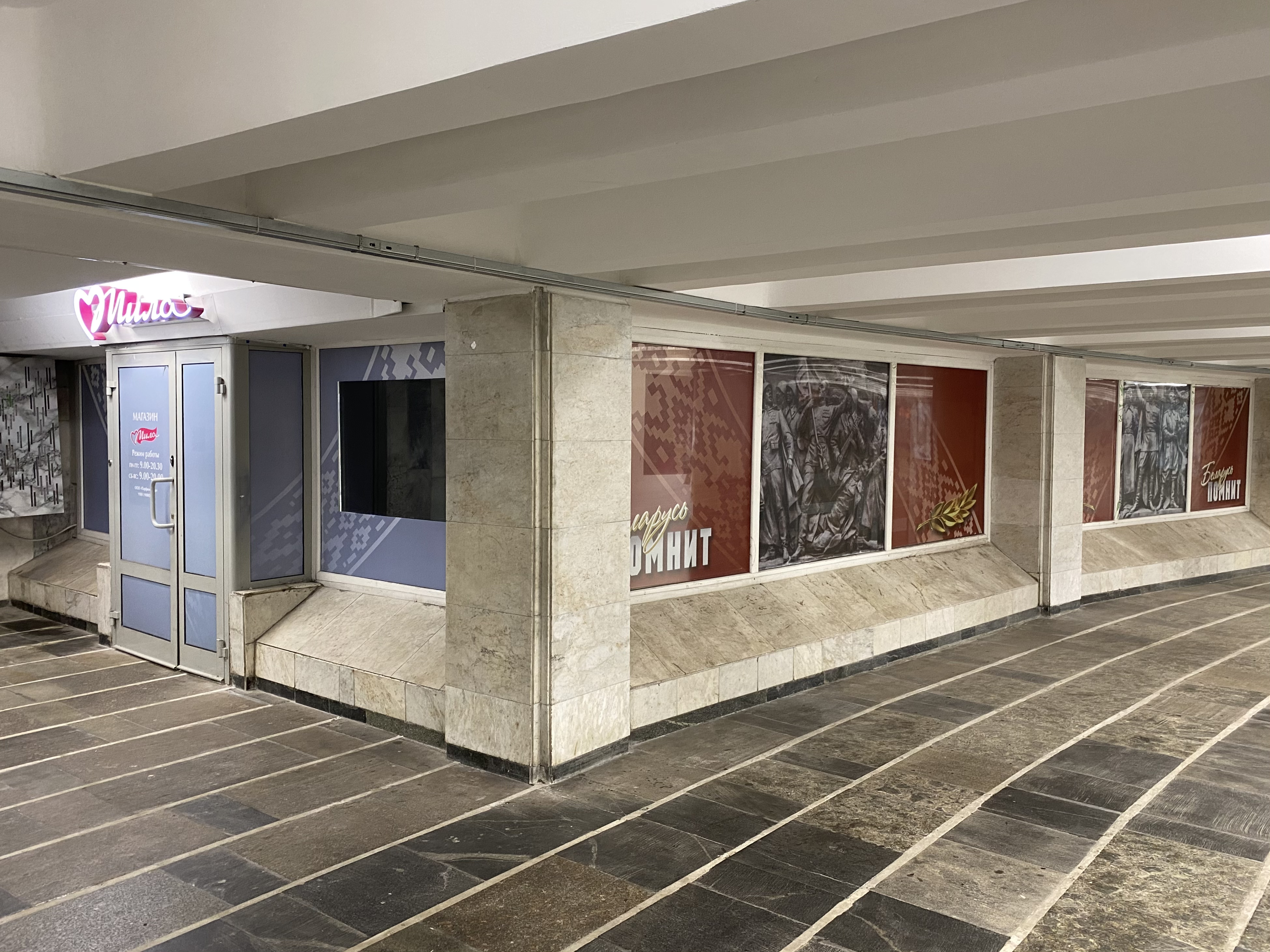

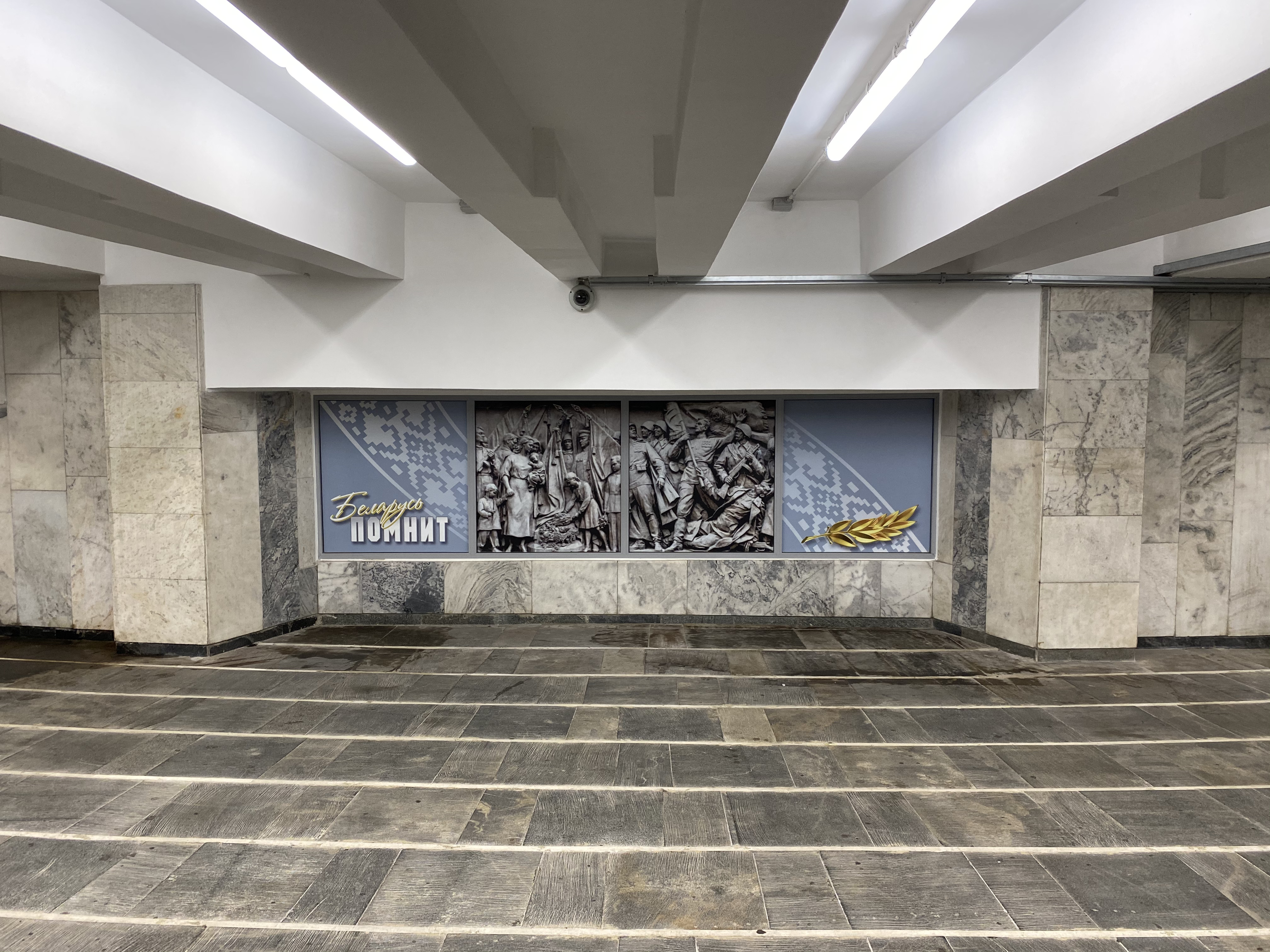

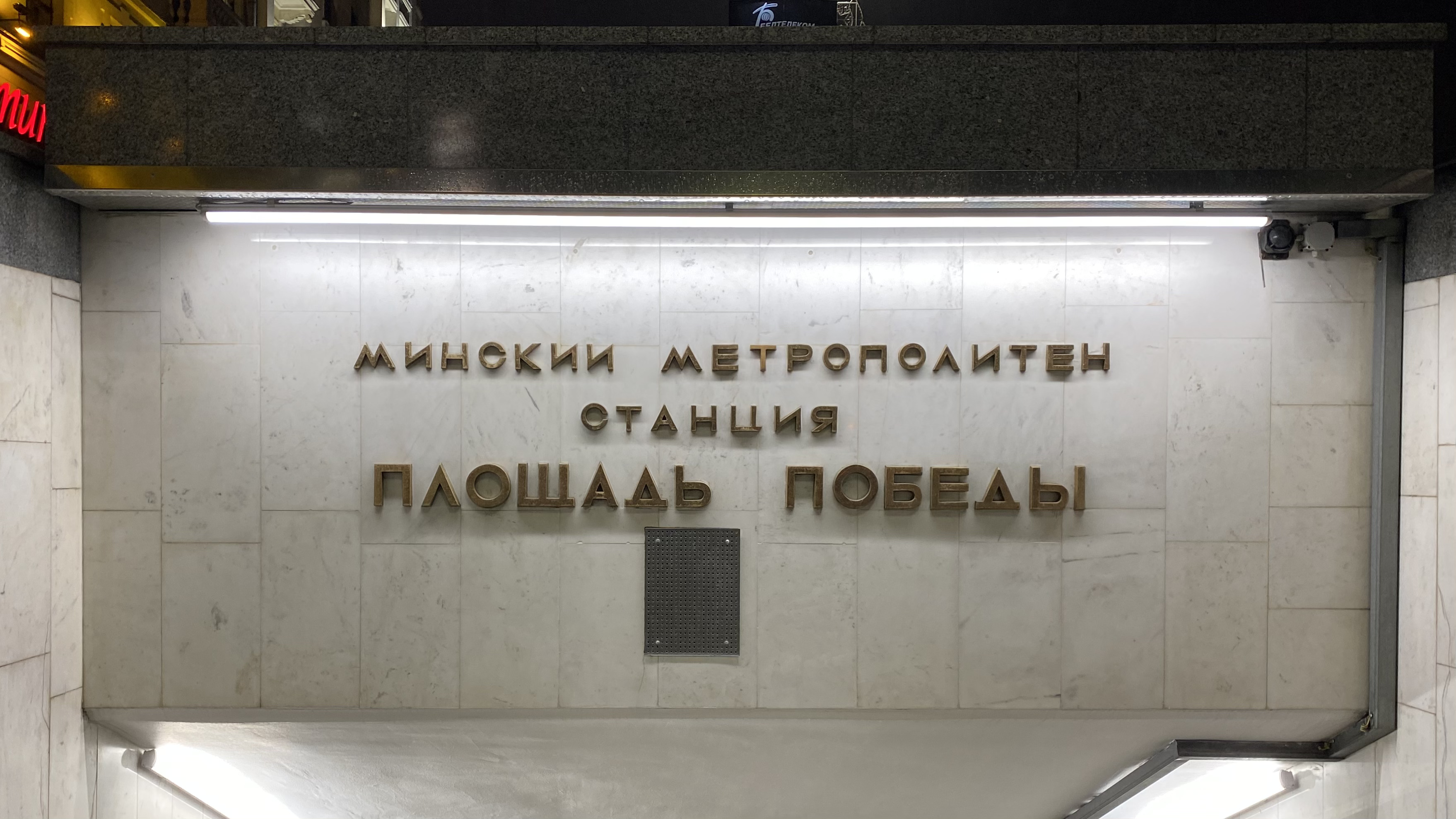

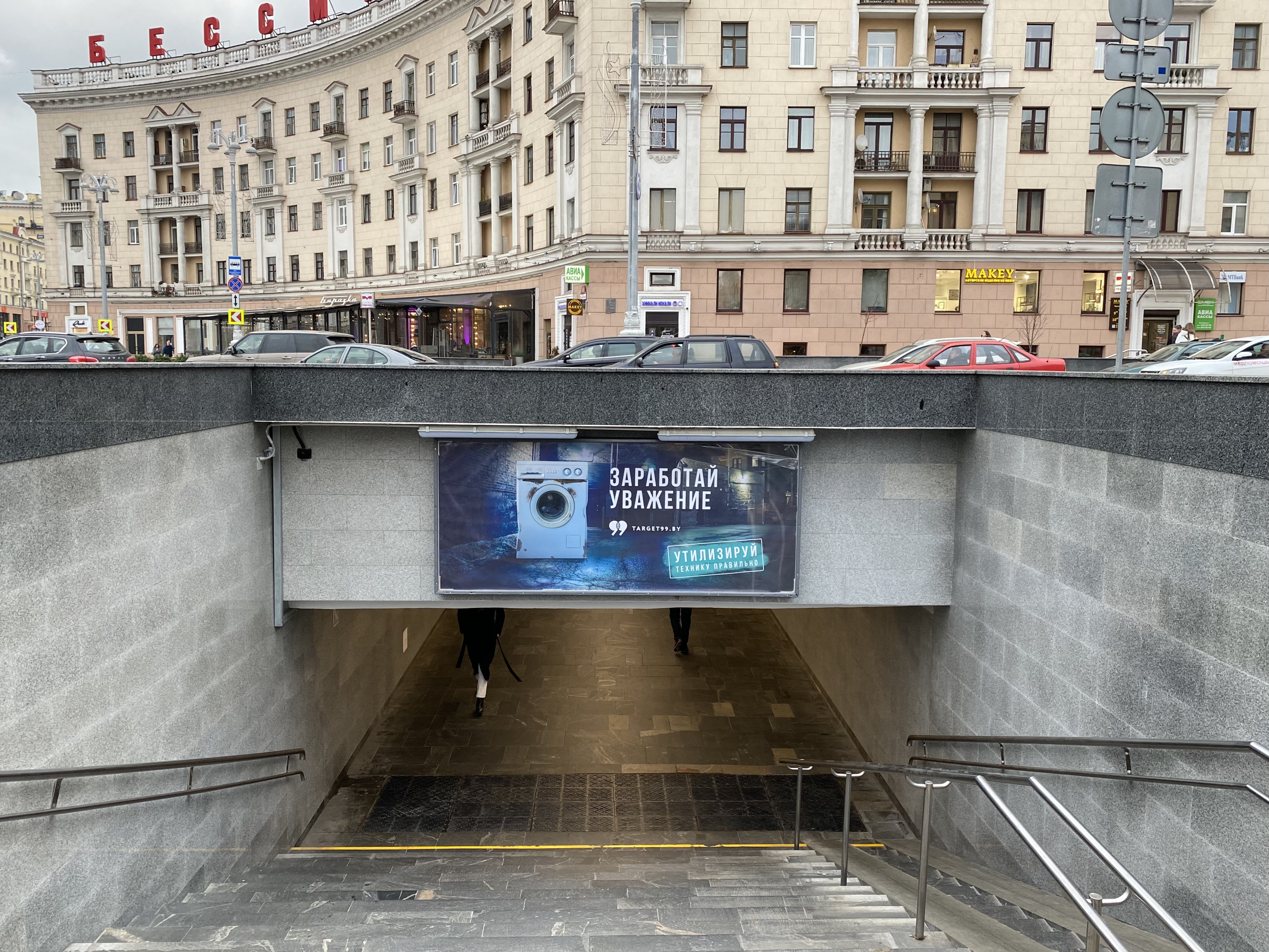
