= Kavaĺskaja Slabada (Minsk Metro) =

Minsk Metro station

Kavaĺskaja Slabada Кавальская Слабада
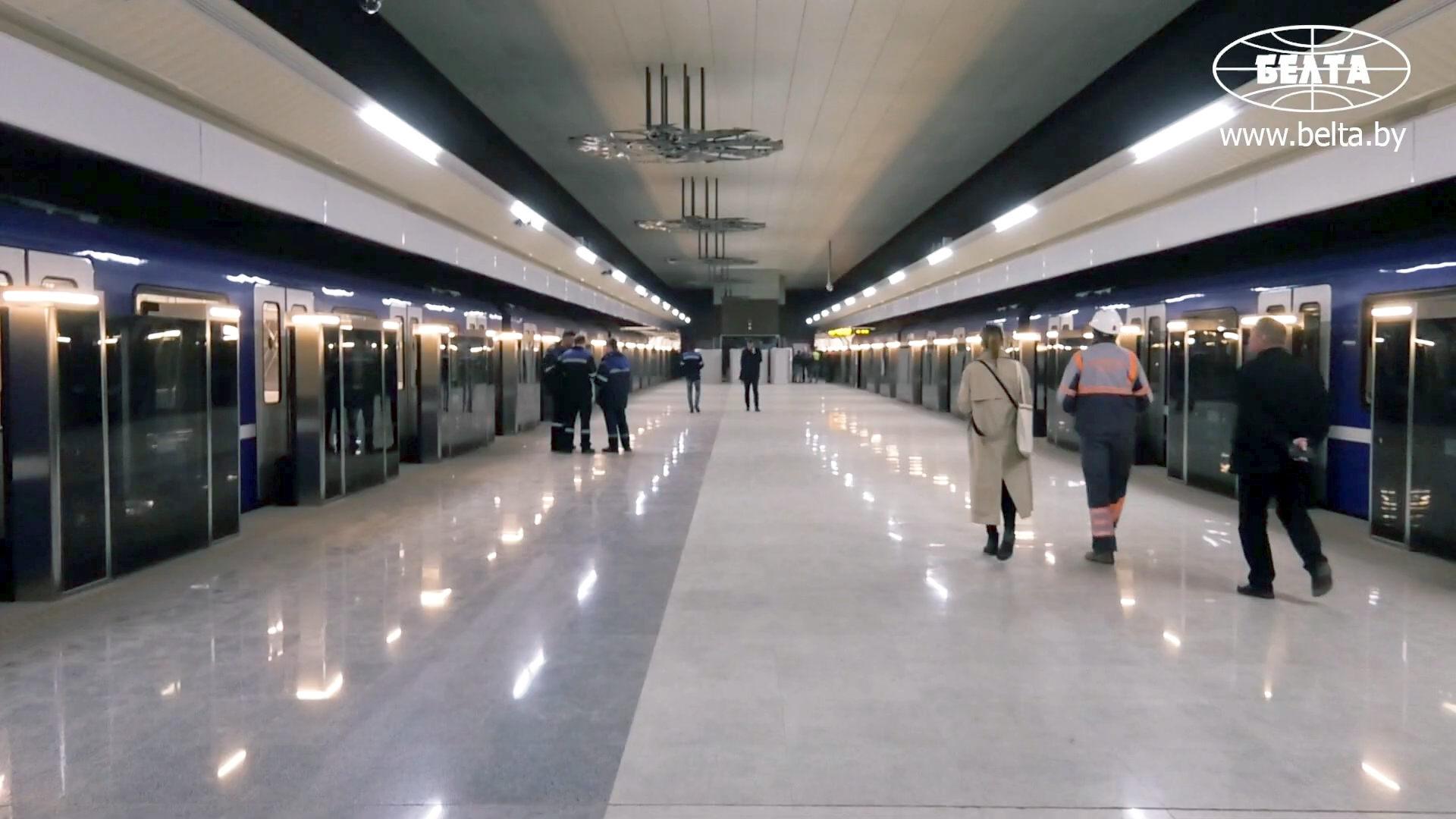
- Kavaĺskaja Slabada metro station, Minsk

General information
- System: Minsk Metro
- Owner: Minsk Metro
- Line: Zelenaluzhskaya line
- Platforms: Island platform
- Tracks: 2

Construction
- Structure type: Underground

Other information
- Station code: 313

History
- Opened: 6 November 2020; 5 years ago

Services
Preceding station	Minsk Metro	Following station
Vakzaĺnaja towards Jubiliejnaja plošča	Zelenaluzhskaya line	Terminus
Location
- Location within Belarus

Kavaĺskaja Slabada (Belarusian: Кавальская Слабада; Russian: Ковальская Слобода) is a Minsk Metro station. It is located at the intersection of Žukoŭskaha and Varanianskaha streets. The station was opened 6 November, 2020 as the southern terminus of the line.

On 30 December 2024 a three-station extension of the line from Kavalskaya Slabada to Slutski Hastsinets was opened, and Kavaĺskaja Slabada ceased to be the terminus of the line.

== Gallery ==
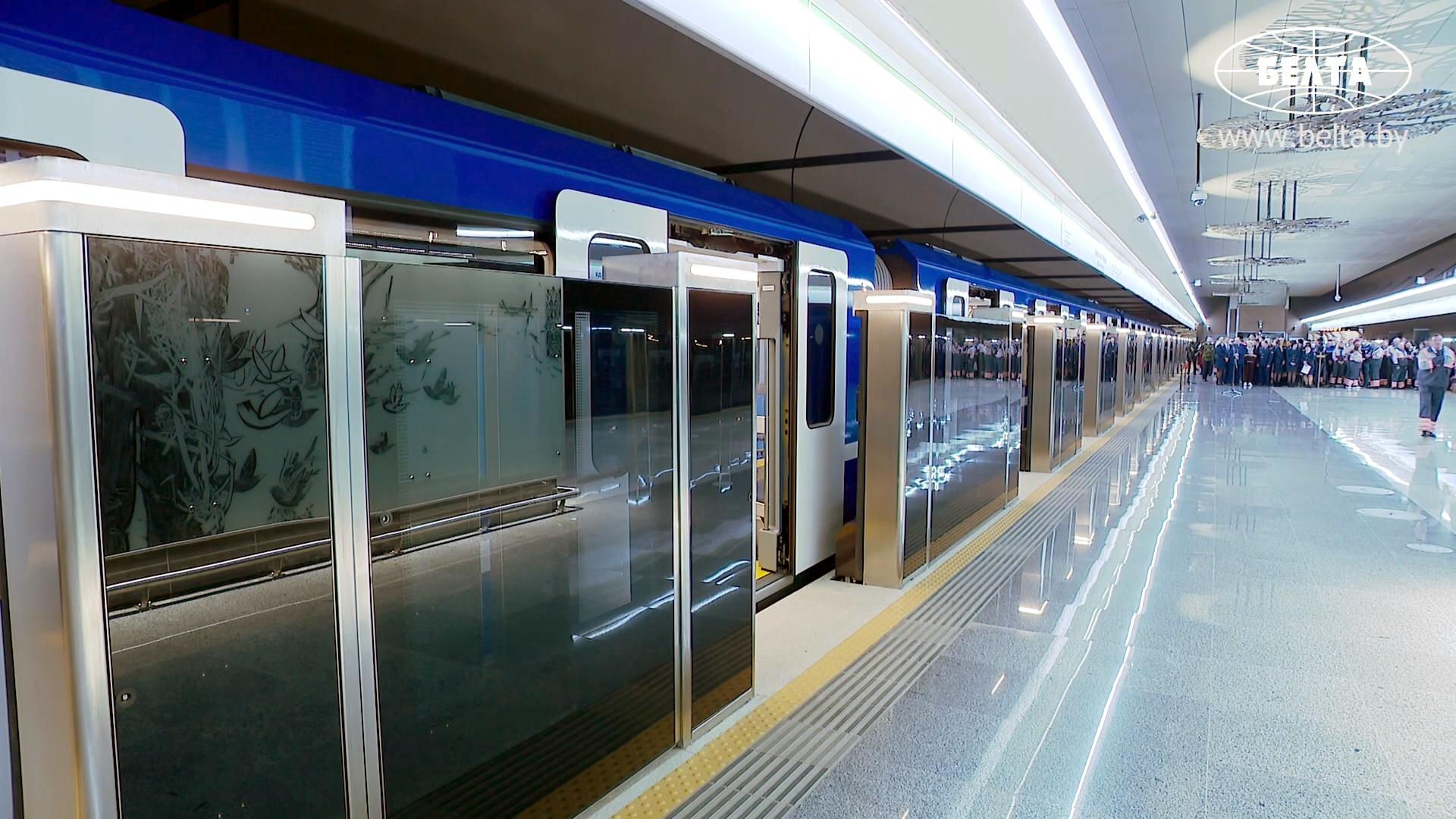

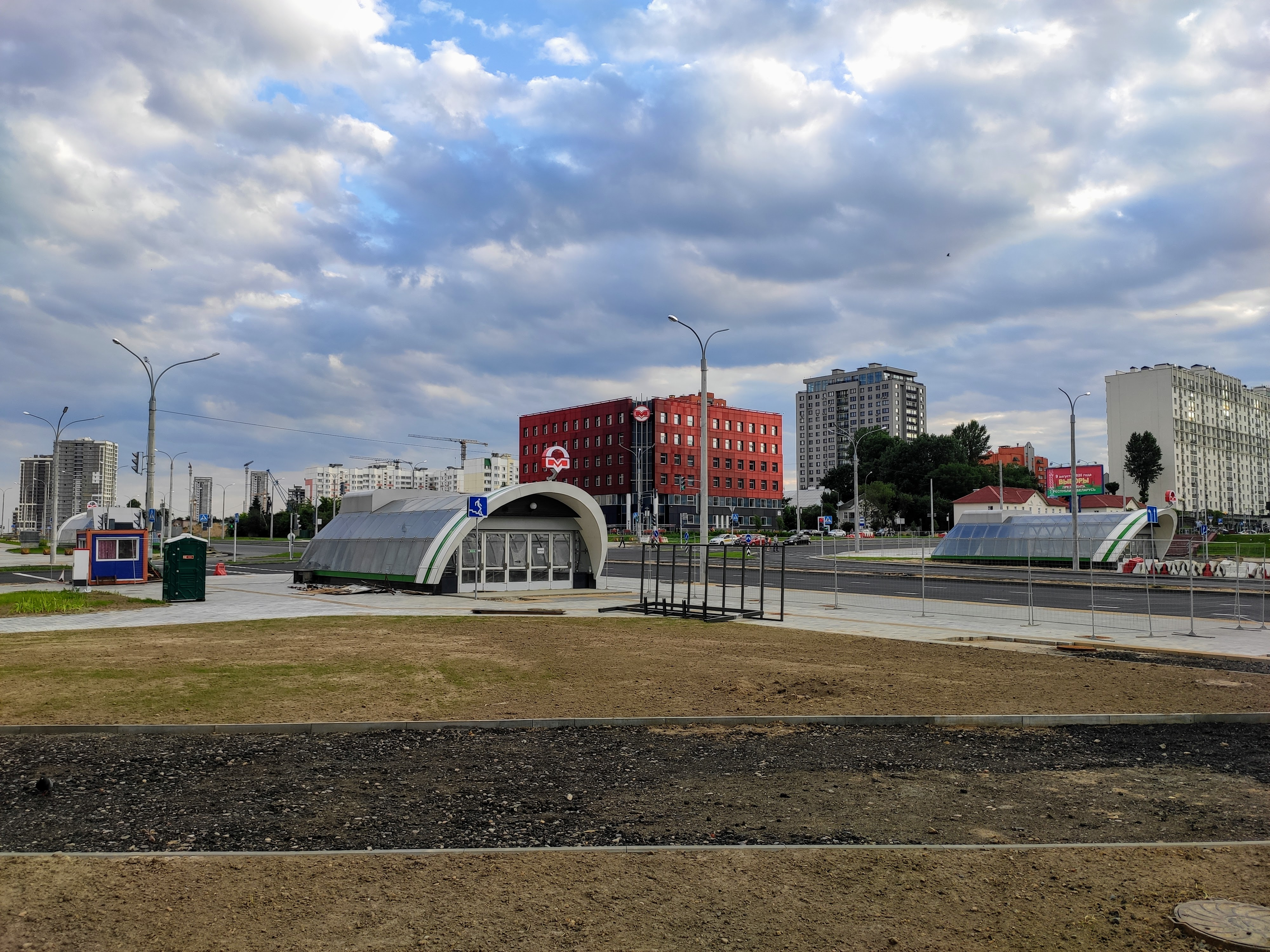

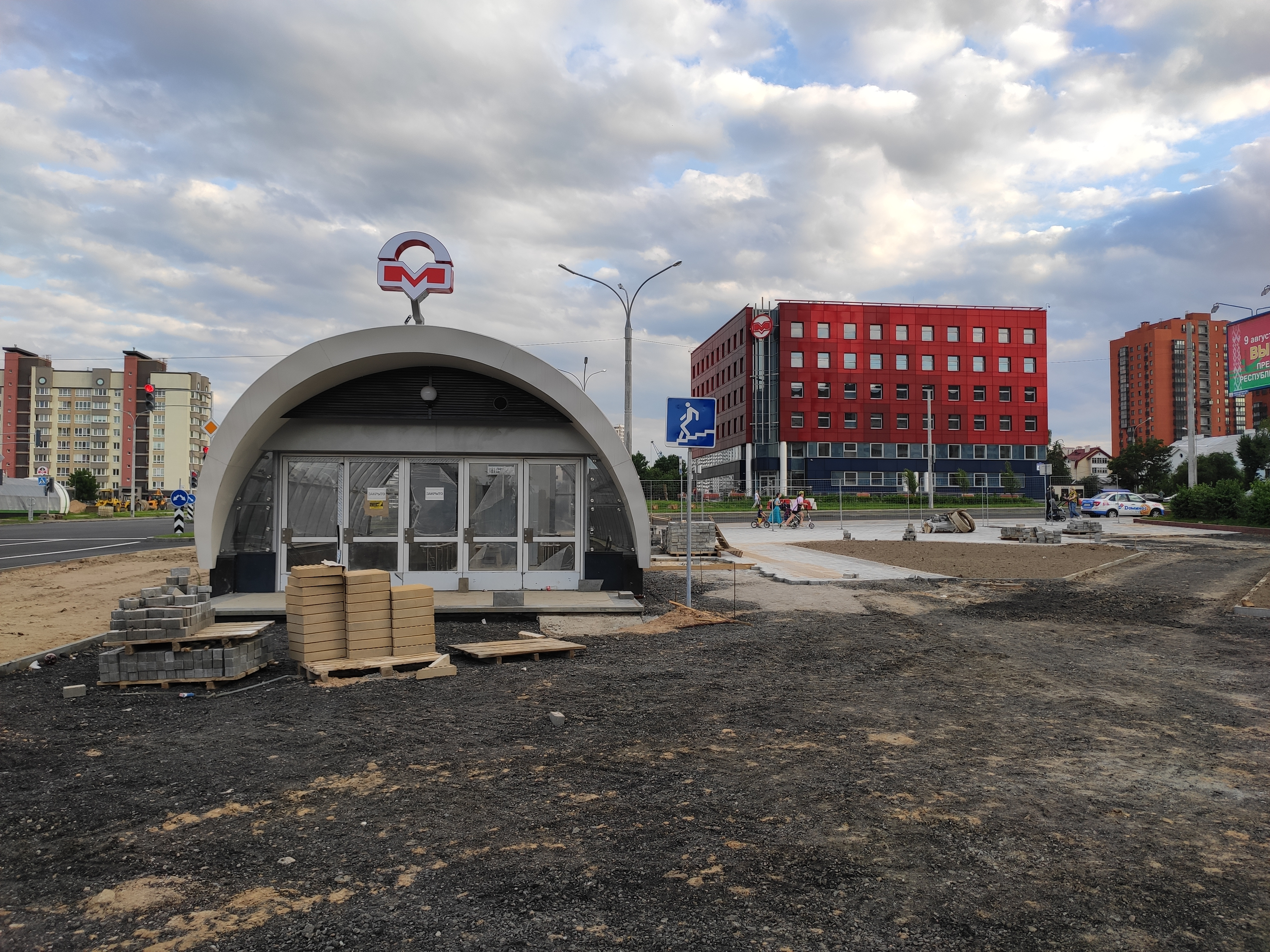

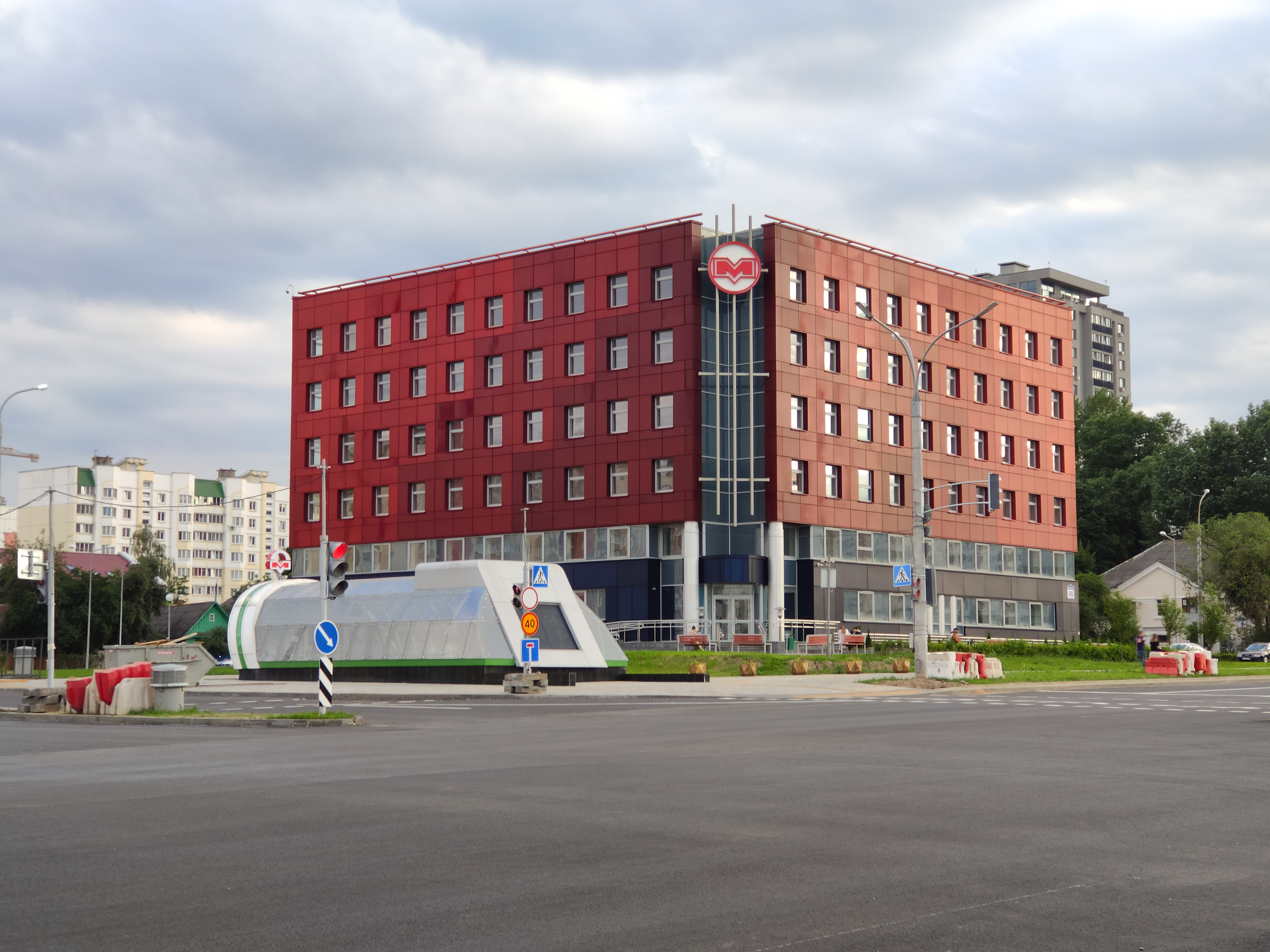
