= Slutski Hastsinets =

Minsk Metro station

Coordinates: 53.8423°N 27.5337°E

Slutski Hastsinets Слуцкі Гасцінец

General information
- System: Minsk Metro
- Line(s): Zelenaluzhskaya line

History
- Opened: 30 December 2024; 9 months ago
Location

Slutski Hastsinets (Belarusian: Слуцкі Гасцінец, Russian: Слуцкий Гостинец, Slutsky Gostinets) is a Minsk Metro station on Zelenaluzhskaya line. It is the southern terminus of the line. It was opened on 30 December 2024 by Alexander Lukashenko as a part of three-station extension of the line from Kavalskaya Slabada to Slutski Hastsinets. The adjacent station is Nemarshanski Sad.
