= Zelenaluzhskaya line =

Minsk Metro line

Overview
- Status: Operational
- Owner: Minsk Metro
- Termini: Jubiliejnaja plošča; Slutski Hastsinets
- Stations: 7

Service
- Type: Rapid transit
- System: Minsk Metro

History
- Opened: 6 November 2020

Technical
- Line length: 7.6 km (4.7 mi)
Route map

The Zelenaluzhskaya line (Belarusian: Зеленалужская лінія; Russian: Зеленолужская линия) is the third line of the Minsk Metro. The line opened in 2020 in Minsk, the capital of Belarus. It comprises 7 stations. The line was officially opened by Alexander Lukashenko and other officials on November 6, 2020. On 30 December, 2024, the second stage of the line - consisting of 4.08 km and three new stations - was completed.

When the line is completed, it will have 14 stations in total. It is to connect the northern and southern areas of Minsk with its center.
