= Parus (Minsk) =

Skyscraper in Minsk

General information
- Status: Completed
- Type: Residential, Office
- Architectural style: Postmodern
- Location: Minsk, Belarus, 16 Kaĺvaryjskaja Street
- Coordinates: 53.90681°N 27.53273°E
- Construction started: 2008
- Completed: 2015

Height
- Roof: 133 m (436 ft)

Technical details
- Structural system: Reinforced concrete
- Floor count: 32

Design and construction
- Architect: Gerasimova Natalia Valentinovna
- Developer: Iterabelstroy

The Parus (Belarusian: Парус, romanized: Sail) is a mixed-use skyscraper in Minsk, Belarus. Built between 2008 and 2015, the tower stands at 133 m (436 ft) tall with 32 floors and is the third tallest building in Belarus. Often dubbed as the country's first-ever skyscraper, it was the tallest in both Minsk and Belarus between 2015 and 2019.

== History ==
The tower is situated at the intersection of the Timiryazev, Maksima Tanka, and Kalvariyskaya streets. The Frunzenskaya, Maladzyozhnaya, and Yubileynaya Ploshad metro stations, as well as Victors Avenue are also in the proximity of the building.

The regulatory framework for skyscraper construction technology in the Republic of Belarus was virtually nonexistent. Two first regulatory documents were developed unde the names of "High-Rise Buildings. Design Standards" and "Construction Standards".

In Minsk, high-rise construction (monolithic reinforced concrete) is also represented by the Royal Plaza business center on Victors Avenue, and the Titan complex from the Dzerzhinsky Avenue, the development of which in the country is exclusively authorized to be carried out by the BelNIIS Institute.

== Architecture ==
The shape of the construction resembles a sailboat in the wind, hence its official name: (Belarusian: Парус, romanized: Russian for "sail"). The total height of the building including the spire is 133 meters.

The 32nd story of the building (which is also the last habitable division) rises to a height of 110 meters, with the total roof elevation going up to 114 meters. This adds to the total height (including the metal structure above the building—the spire). The ventilated façade was designed utilizing a system of porcelain stoneware tiles and architectural glass which doubles sound insulation, reduces heat loss, and performs as a sunscreen during summertime.

The residential building offers between one and four-room apartments ranging from 61 to 179 m^{2} (1,930 sq ft) with ceilings of 3 meters high. It houses a total of 204 apartments, each with a proper parking space in the multi-parking system which was the country's first system of semi-automated parking modules at the time of its construction. The upper floors feature two-level penthouses with access to an open terrace. In addition to residential space, the project included commercial real estate, administrative offices, and public spaces with a total area of 6,328 m^{2} (68,100 sq ft).

The framework of the building was topped out in the last quarter of 2012, respectively the first quarter of 2013, as the building was fully completed and commissioned by the first quarter of 2015.

== See also ==
- List of tallest buildings in Belarus

Records
| Preceded by Royal Plaza | Tallest building in Belarus; 2015–2019; 133 metres (436 ft) | Succeeded by Lazurit |
