= Minsk International Financial Center =

Skyscraper complex in Minsk

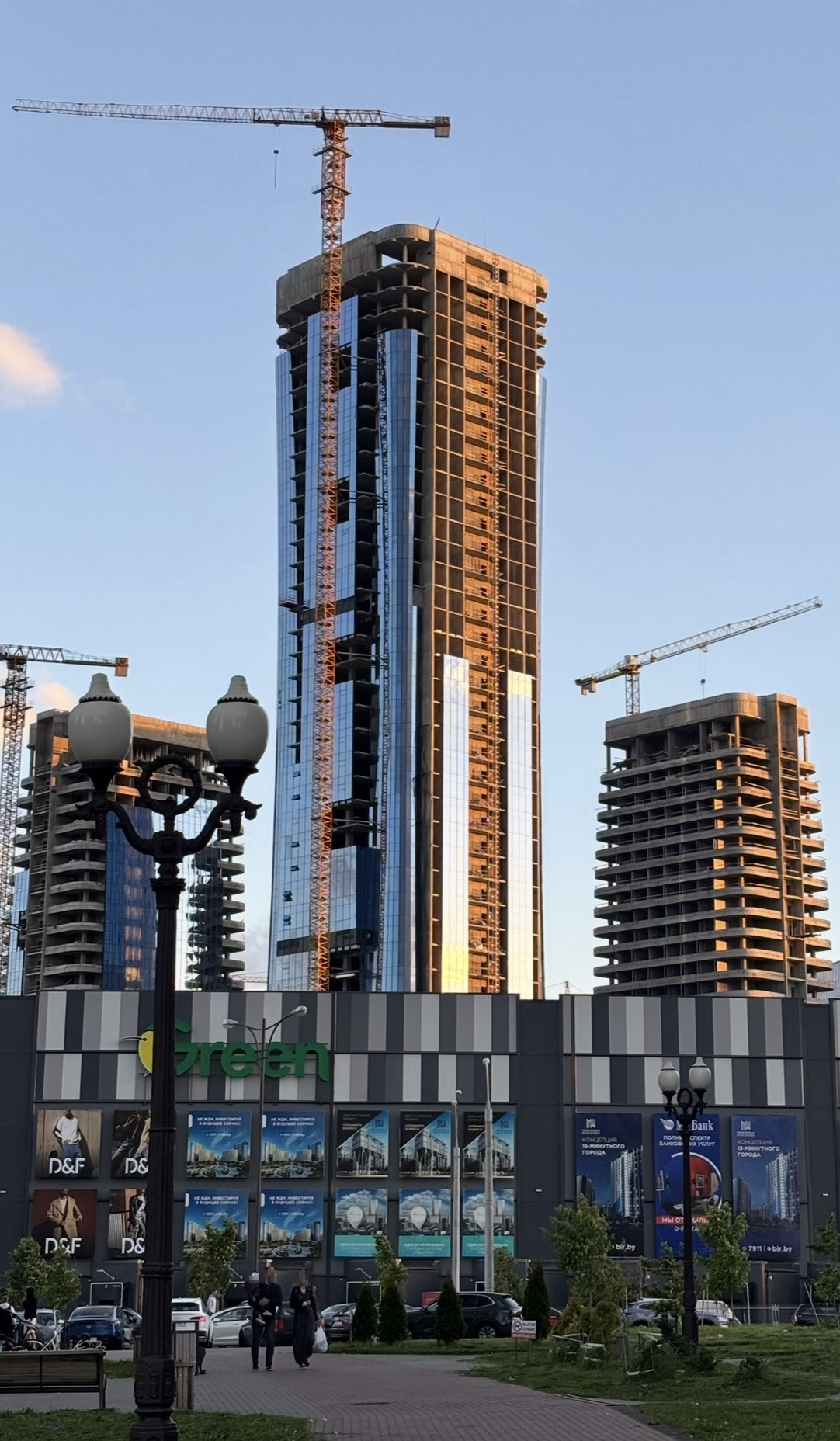
- The MFC Tower (middle) under construction in July 2026

General information
- Status: Under construction
- Type: Residential, Office
- Location: Minsk, Belarus
- Coordinates: 53.86584°N 27.54749°E
- Construction started: 2022
- Completed: 2027

Height
- Roof: 168.2 m (552 ft) (MFC)

Technical details
- Structural system: Reinforced concrete
- Floor count: 42 (MFC)

Design and construction
- Developer: Dana Holdings

The Minsk International Financial Center (MFC) (Belarusian: Мінскі міжнародны фінансавы цэнтр) is a mixed-use high-rise complex in Minsk, Belarus. It comprises five high-rise towers, out of which the MFC is the tallest, standing at 168.2 m (552 ft) with 42 floors which is the current tallest building in Belarus. The complex is part of the Minsk Mir district.

The skyscraper is currently in a height race against the Gazprom Center on Filimonova Street which is also under construction. Completion of the Minsk International Financial Center is scheduled for the end of 2027.

== History ==
The construction site of the Minsk International Financial Center is located in the multifunctional Minsk Mir district, along Mira Avenue. The Avia Mall shopping and entertainment center is located adjacent to the complex. The new Aerodromnaya metro station is within walking distance of the financial center.

According to the original design, the Minsk International Financial Center is to be a complex of five buildings of varying heights, arranged in an angular shape. The area between Bratskaya Street and Mira Avenue was allocated for construction. Construction officially began on July 14, 2022, but work was already underway in 2021. The total area of the five buildings in the complex is expected to rise up to 97,290 m^{2} (1,050,000 sq ft). A 19,550 m^{2} (210,000 sq ft) underground parking garage is planned, as well as a 2,000 m^{2} (21,500 sq ft) spa center and large swimming pools for adults and children.

At the beginning of construction, it was reported that the height of the central 42-storey tower would be about 180 m, but later reports indicated a final height of about 164 m, however, according to the project, the height of the building is 158.5 m. The smallest building in the complex has 14 levels.

According to the developer, the Financial Center and surrounding neighborhoods will also include several thousand business apartments and commercial spaces. This is a new and special category of housing, allowing both residents and businesses to register.

At the moment, it is known that all floors in the central and neighboring buildings have been erected and that glazing of the towers has begun.

== Construction chronology ==
The complex in April 2024

and in February 2025

== See also ==
- List of tallest buildings in Belarus

Records
Preceded by Lazurit	Tallest building in Belarus; 2024–present 168.2 metres (552 ft)	Incumbent
