= Lazurit Residential Complex =

Skyscraper complex in Minsk

General information
- Status: Completed
- Type: Residential
- Location: Minsk, Belarus, 115 Victors Avenue
- Coordinates: 53.93438°N 27.47787°E
- Construction started: 2011
- Completed: 2021

Height
- Roof: 138.6 m (455 ft)

Technical details
- Structural system: Reinforced concrete
- Floor count: 37 (main section)

Design and construction
- Architects: Evgeniy Stanislavovich; Anna Aleksandrovna
- Developer: Nikolai Burnos (2011–2014); Varmani (2014–2015); UKS of the Minsk City Executive Committee (2015ndash;present)

The Lazurit Residential Complex (Belarusian: ЖК Лазурыт) is a high-rise residential complex in Minsk, Belarus built between 2011 and 2022. The tallest division of the project is a 37-story section standing at 138.6 m (455 ft) tall which was the tallest building in Belarus between 2019 (topped out) and 2024.

== History ==
=== Project management ===
Construction of the building began in 2011. It was then that a time capsule with a message to future generations was laid. The very first investor of the complex was businessman Nikolai Burnos. He planned to invest 120 million US dollars in the project. However, he did not have enough funding. At that time, the businessman planned to sell a square meter for 2,500 US dollars. In 2013, the developer reduced the price to 2,000 US dollars. Contrary to expectations, the demand for luxury housing was insufficient. Construction stalled, and over time, this fact caused discontent among city authorities. The building was planned to be completed in time for the 2014 IIHF World Championship. However, contrary to expectations, people did not see the building as being beautiful next to the Minsk Arena, but a long-term construction project. The completion of the building was then postponed until 2016.

In 2014, the project passed into the hands of real estate compny of Varmani LLC. It was at this point that changes to the original design began to appear. Only remnant pieces of the original design were implemented. While the project was in Varmani's hands, the skyscraper acquired the name "Lazurit". In 2015, at a meeting, President of the Republic of Belarus Alexander Lukashenko ordered "to kick out the would-be investors". The order was carried out that same day.

In 2015, the project was transferred to the Minsk City Executive Committee's Capital Construction Department. The previous company refused to hand over the design and estimate documentation for the project to the state developer. In September 2015, Dmitry Mikulenok, director of the Minsk City Executive Committee's Capital Construction Department, announced that profits from apartment sales would be used to build the Rhythmic Gymnastics Palace. In 2016, the building's architecture was modified. Not a trace remained of the original design. At that time, the price per meter was 1,830 US dollars. The building's completion date was postponed until April 15, 2018. However, the completion date was postponed again until December 2021. The corresponding decree was signed by the president of the country.

On October 26, 2020, there was a fire in the office part of the building which was quickly put off..

=== Services and facilities ===
The customer is the UP "UKS Minsk City Executive Committee", the contractor is OJSC "Stroytrest No. 4". The building houses a clinic.

The building includes:

a three-section 15-17-19-story residential building (including 13-15-17 residential floors) with 279 apartments on Pobediteley Avenue; 37-story high-rise section (33 residential floors, including two two-level penthouses on the top floors) with 292 apartments; a three-section 15-17-19-story residential building (including 13-15-17th residential floors) on Narochanskaya Street with 307 apartments; underground 2-storey garage-parking The complex's grounds are closed to outsiders. According to the client, it is also equipped with a well-designed parking and access system. The grounds include children's playgrounds, sports fields, green areas, lawns, gazebos, and numerous small architectural features. In addition to the standard parking lot, the complex also features underground parking, which can also accommodate bicycles. The access to the complex is made by an access card.

In 2011, the project received a National Award rendering it as the best in the country.

== See also ==
- List of tallest buildings in Belarus

Records
| Preceded by Royal Plaza | Tallest building in Belarus; 2019–2024; 138.6 metres (455 ft) | Succeeded by Minsk International; Financial Center |
