= Jubiliejnaja plošča (Minsk Metro) =

Minsk Metro station

Jubiliejnaja plošča Юбілейная плошча
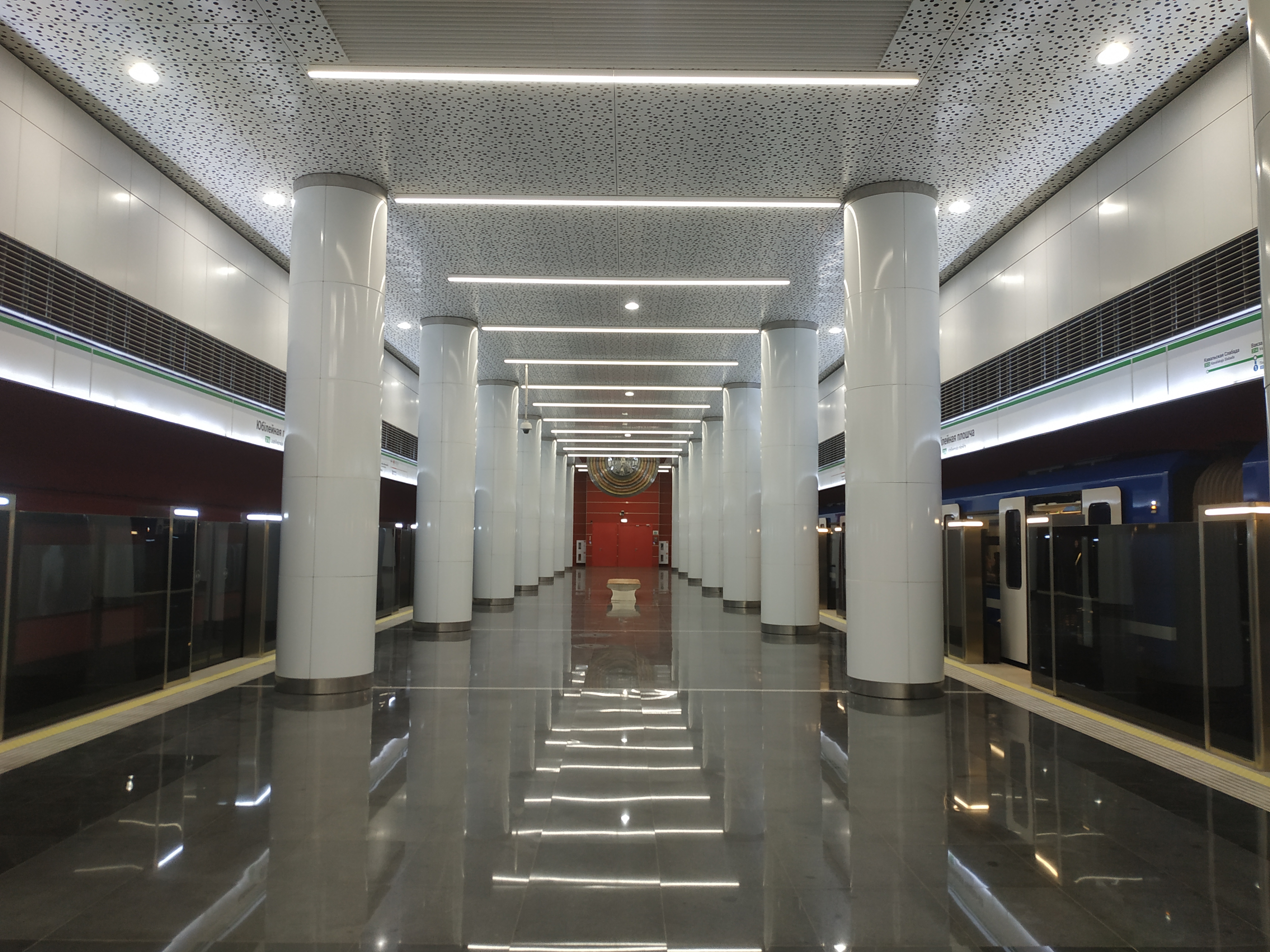
- Jubiliejnaja plošča metro station, Minsk; Station Hall

General information
- Coordinates: 53.9047°N 27.5404°E
- System: Minsk Metro
- Owner: Minsk Metro
- Line: Zelenaluzhskaya line
- Platforms: 1 island platform
- Tracks: 2
- Connections: Awtazavodskaya line (Frunzyenskaya)

Construction
- Structure type: Underground
- Depth: 32 m (105 ft)

Other information
- Station code: 316

History
- Opened: 6 November 2020; 5 years ago

Services
Preceding station	Minsk Metro	Following station
Terminus	Zelenaluzhskaya line	Plošča Franciška Bahuševiča towards Kavaĺskaja Slabada
Transfer at Frunzyenskaya
Maladzyozhnaya towards Kamyennaya Horka	Awtazavodskaya line transfer at Frunzyenskaya	Nyamiha towards Mahilyowskaya
Location
- Location within Belarus

Jubiliejnaja plošča (Belarusian: Юбілейная плошча; Russian: Юбилейная площадь) is a Minsk Metro station. It is located on Jubiliejnaja plošča at the intersection of Suchaja and Kaĺvaryjskaja streets. The station was opened on November 6, 2020.

It is a transfer station to the Frunzyenskaya station on the Awtazavodskaya line. The station is the deepest in the Minsk metro - its depth is 32 meters.

== Gallery ==
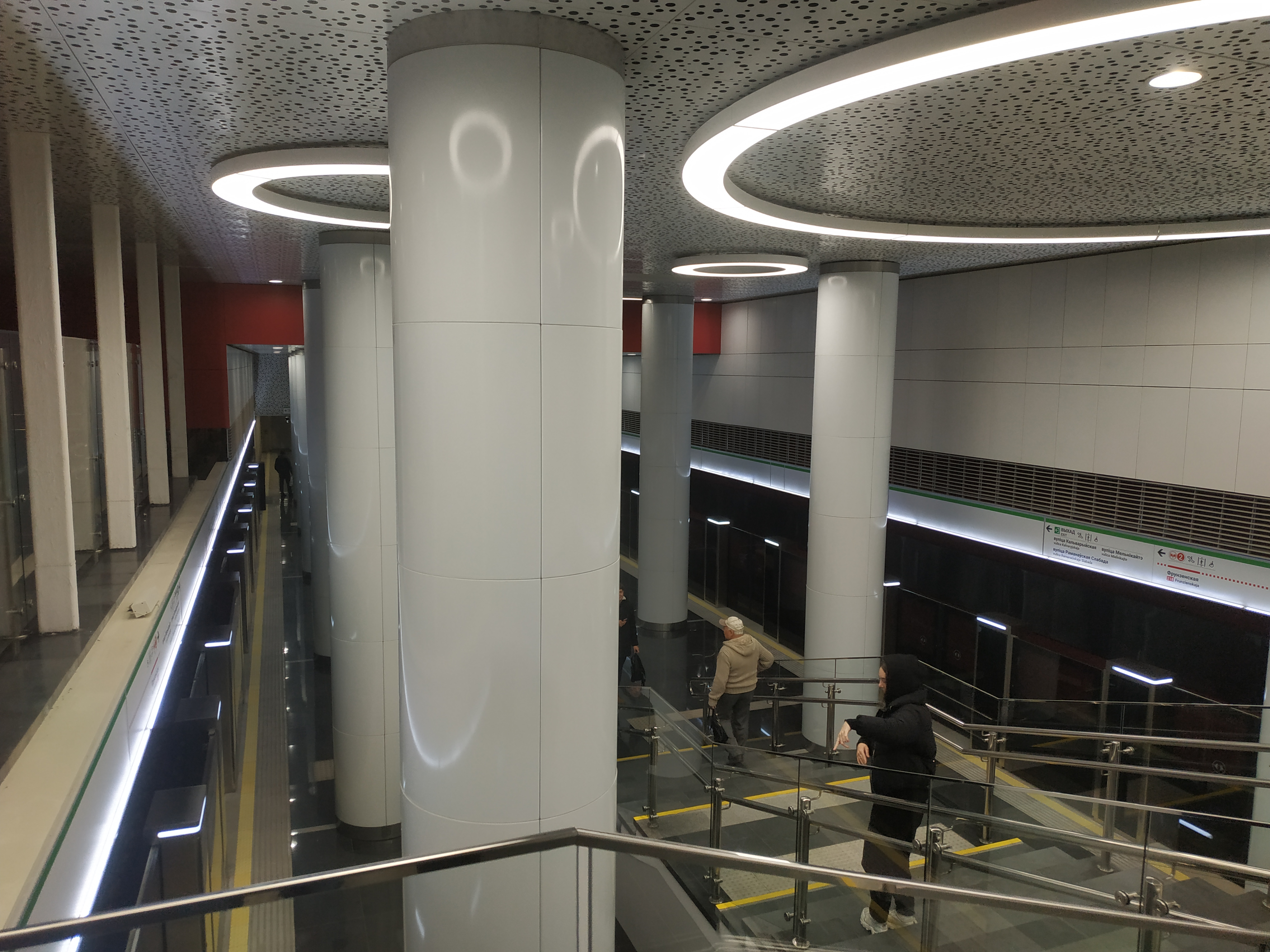

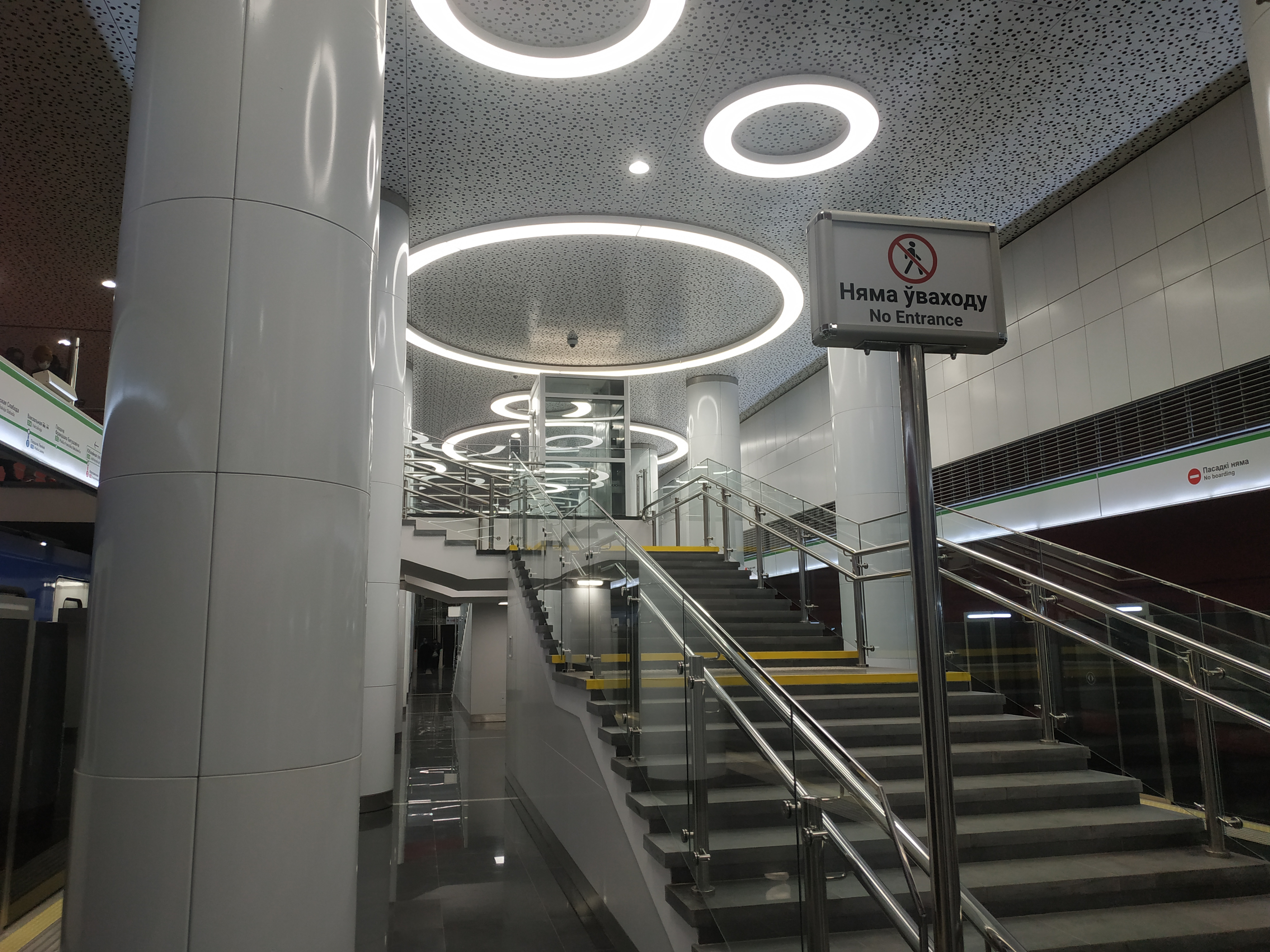

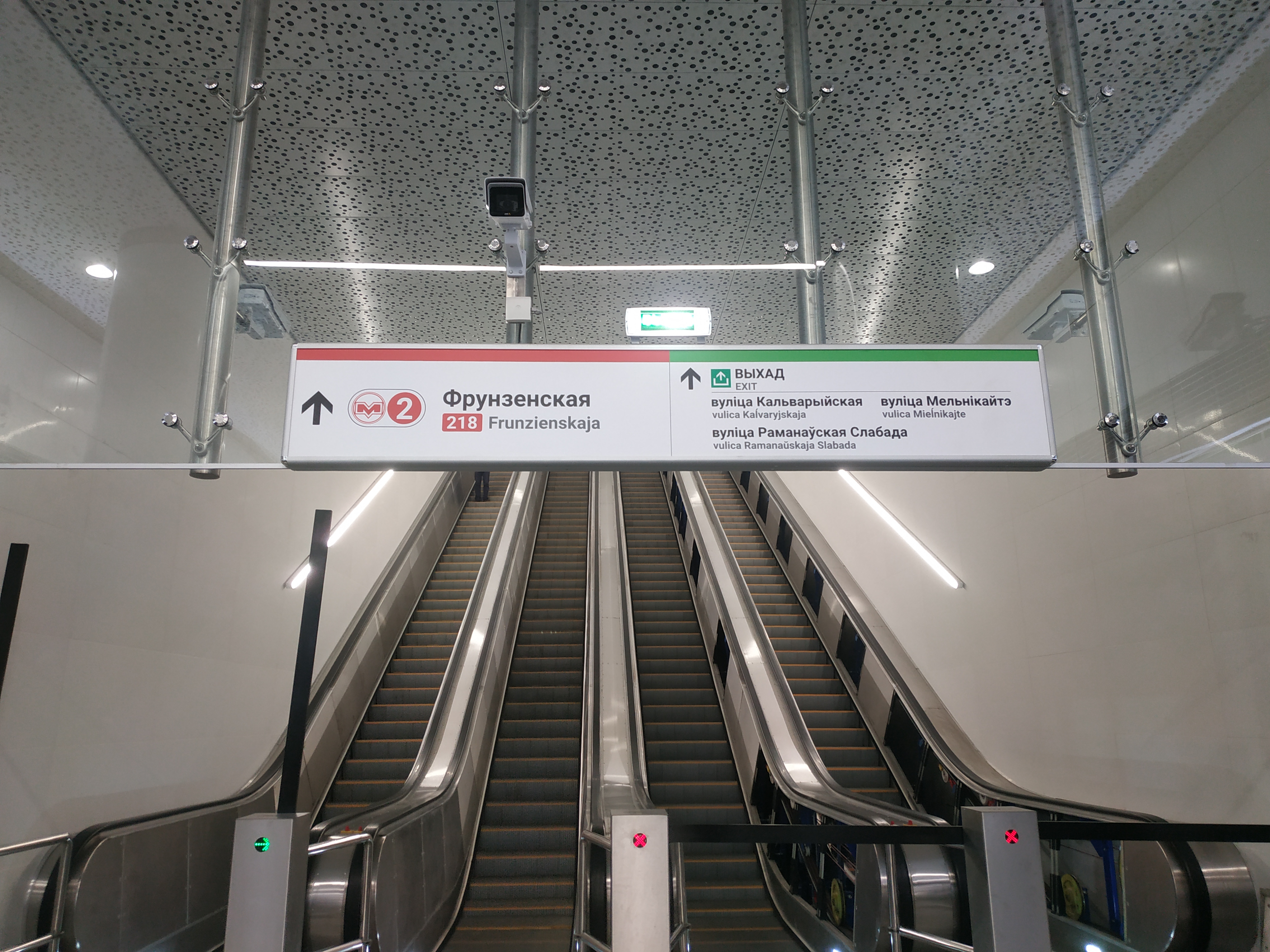

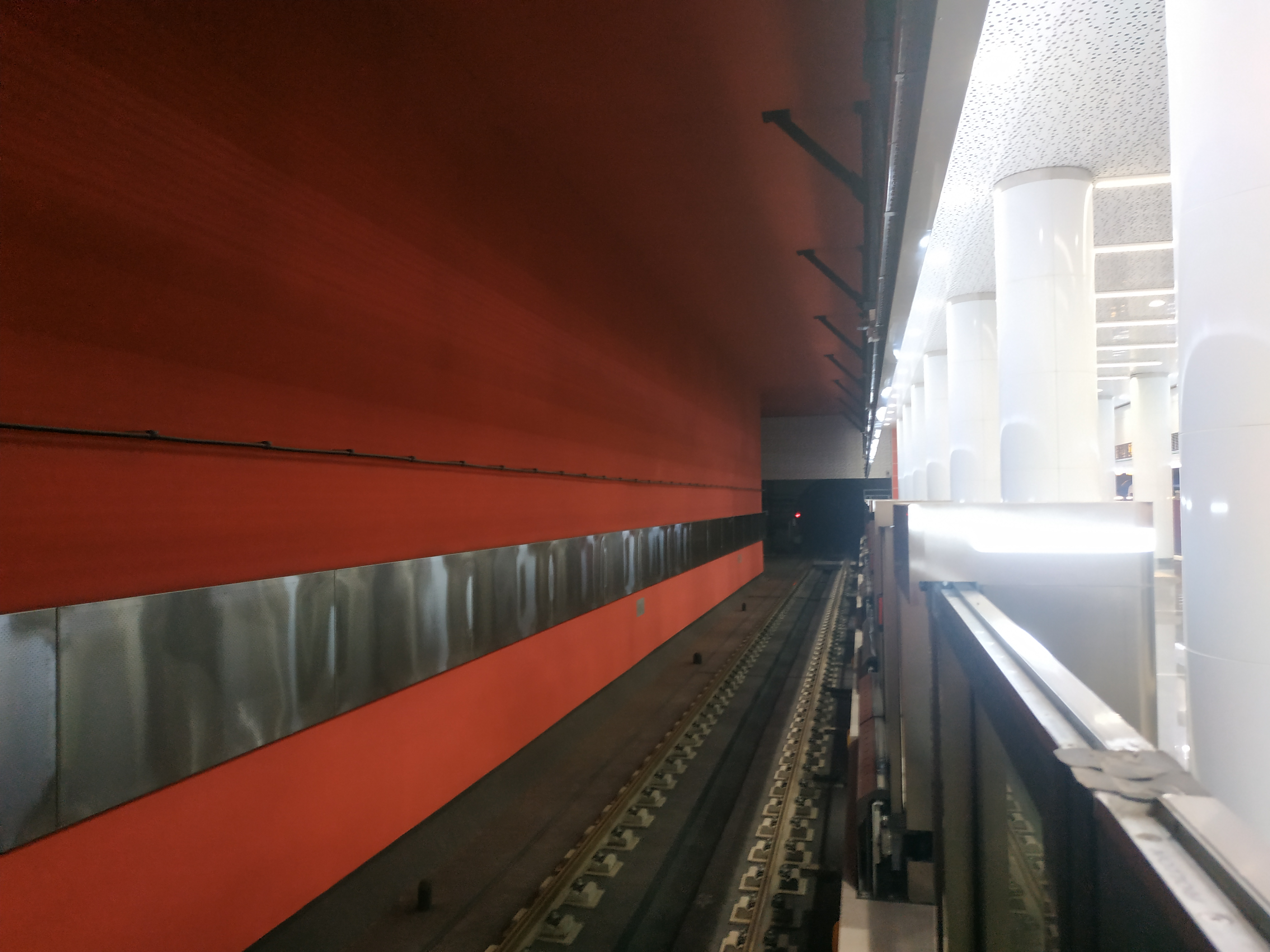

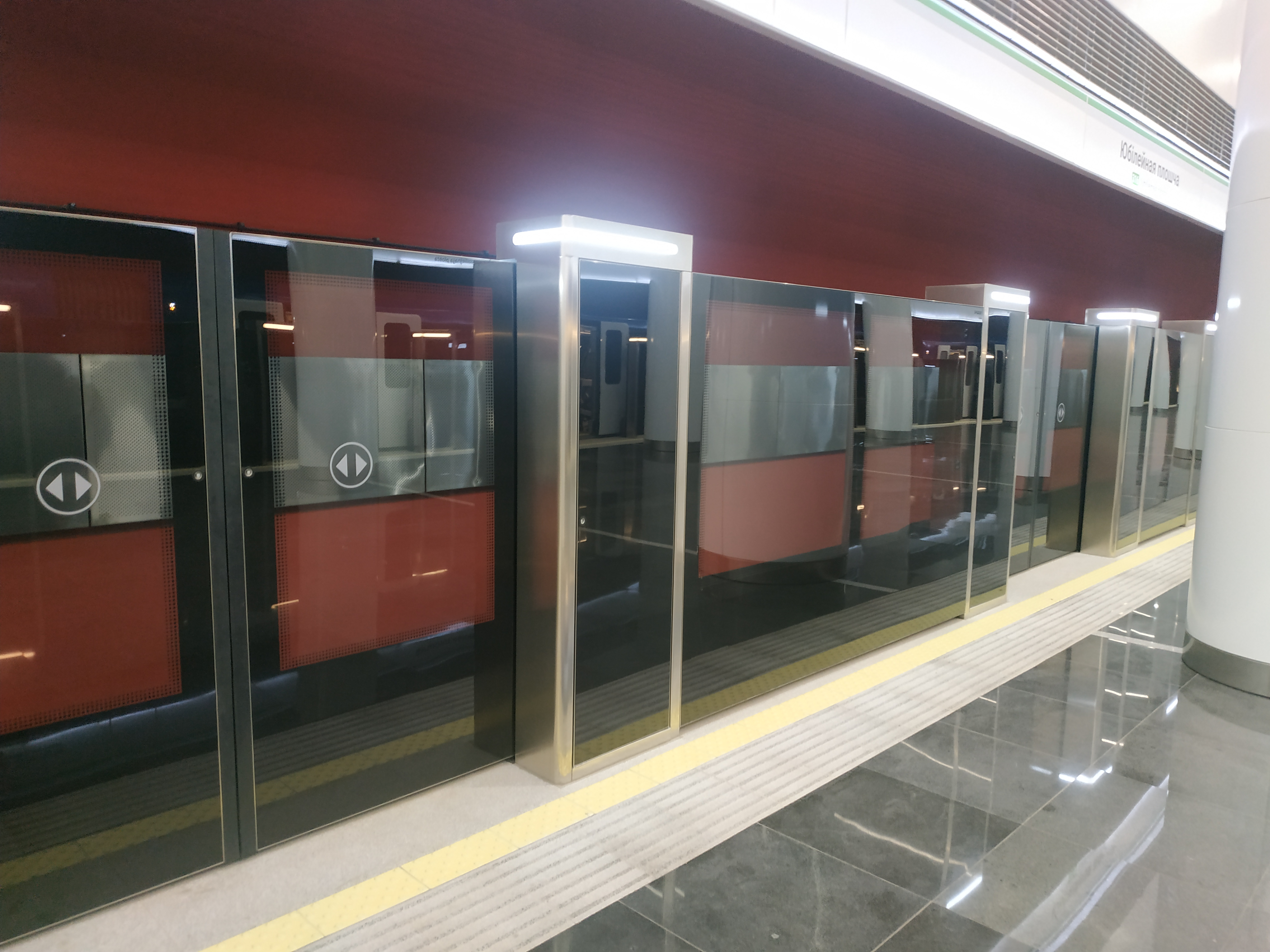

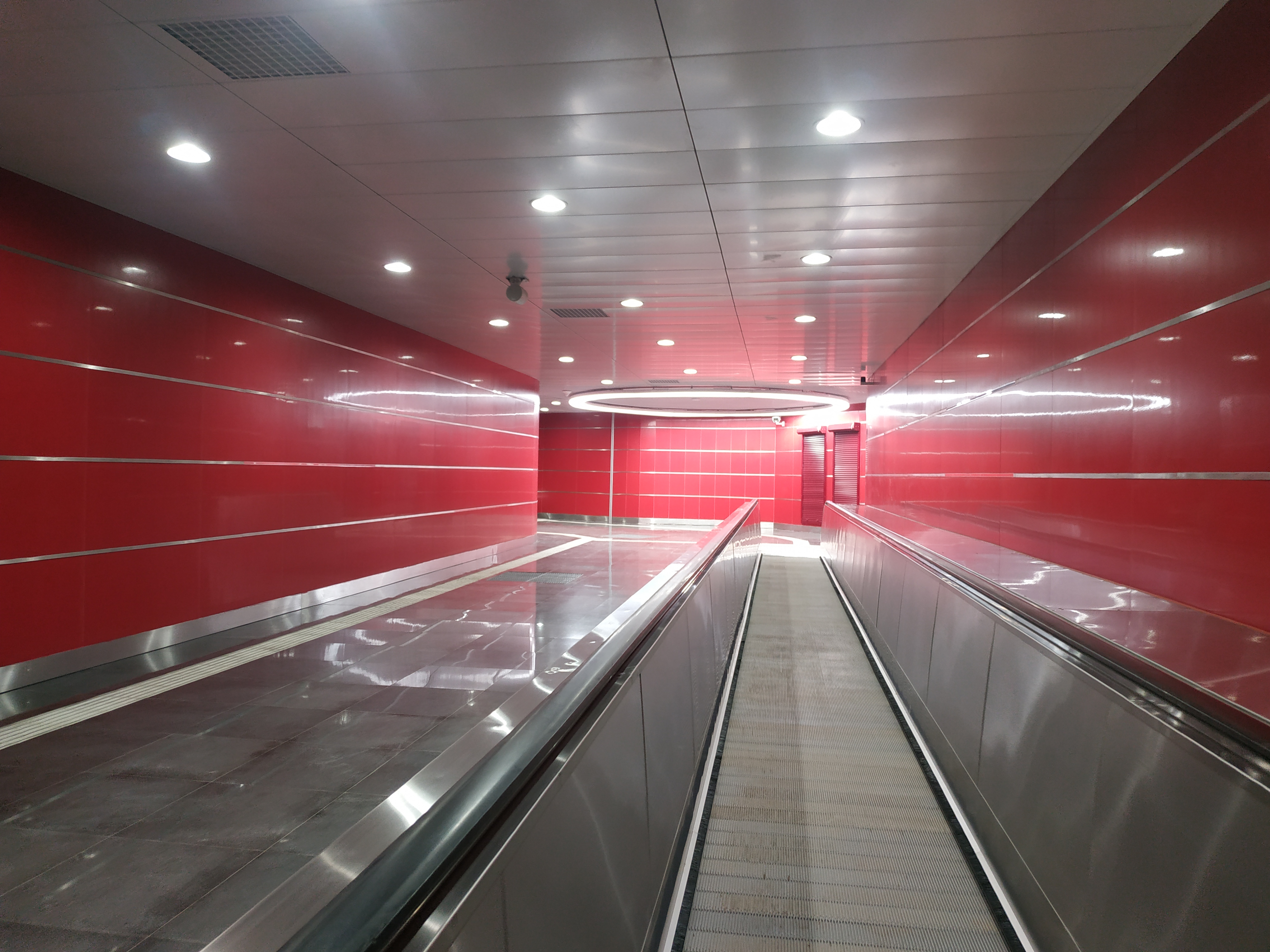

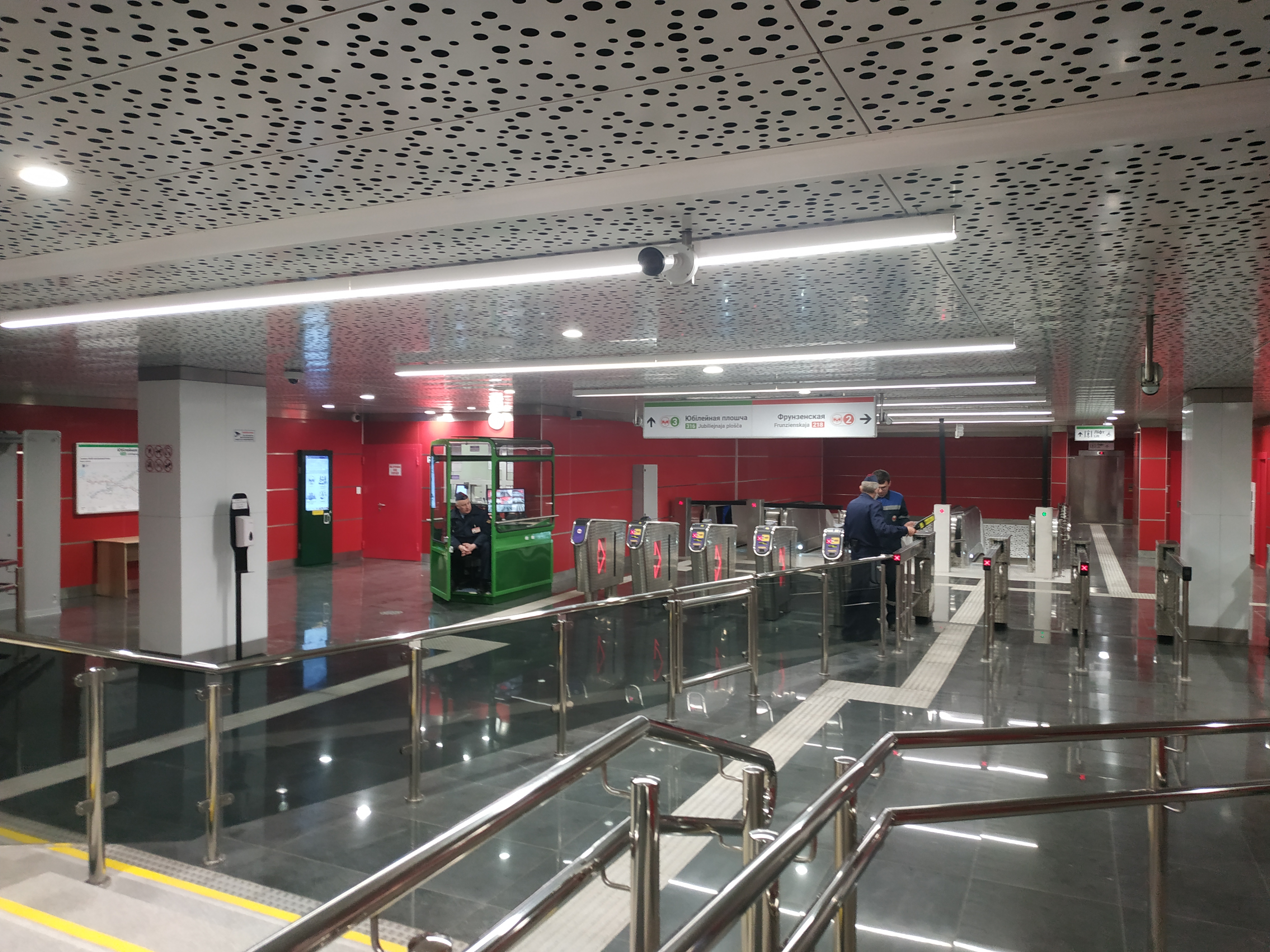

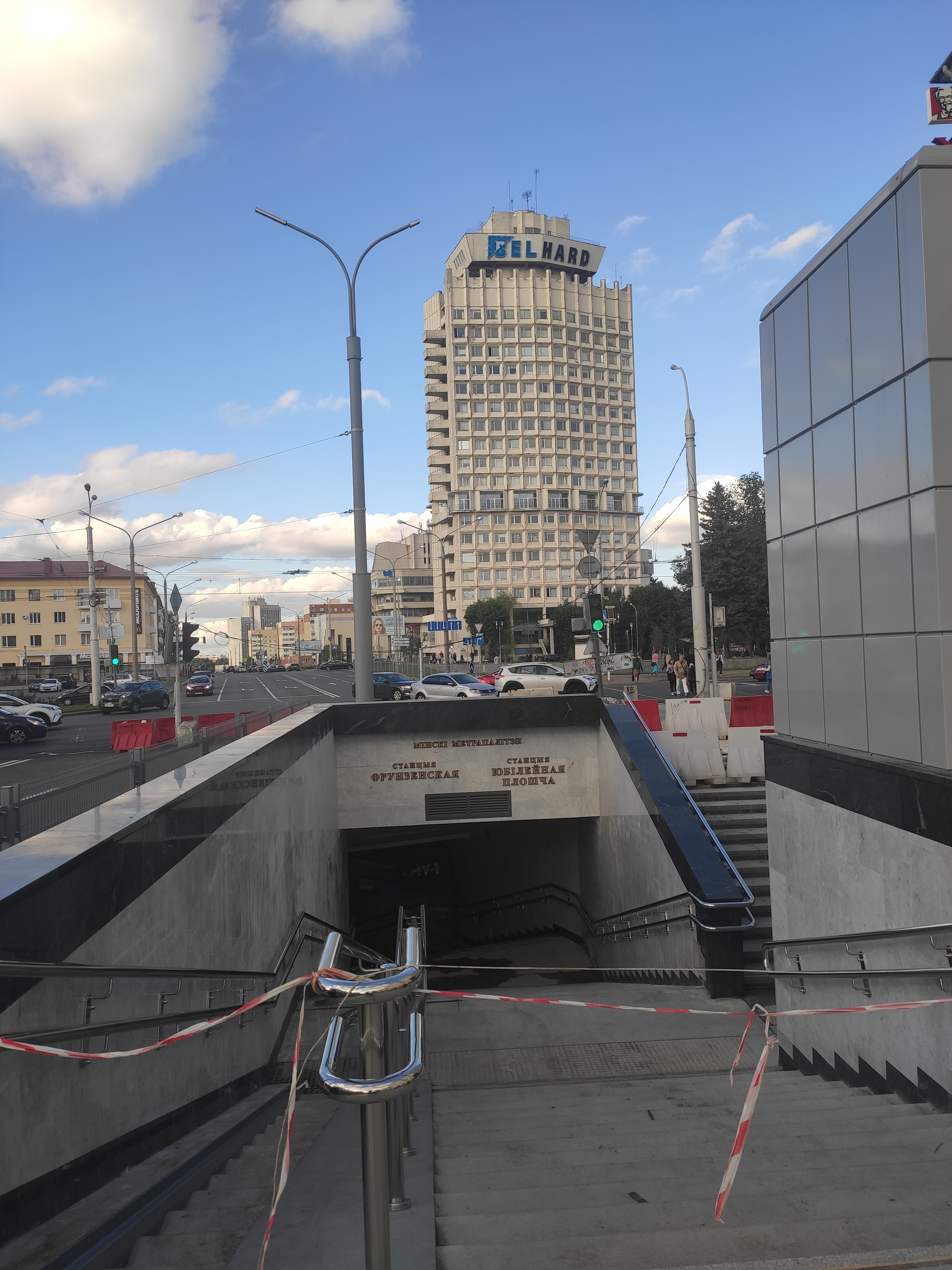

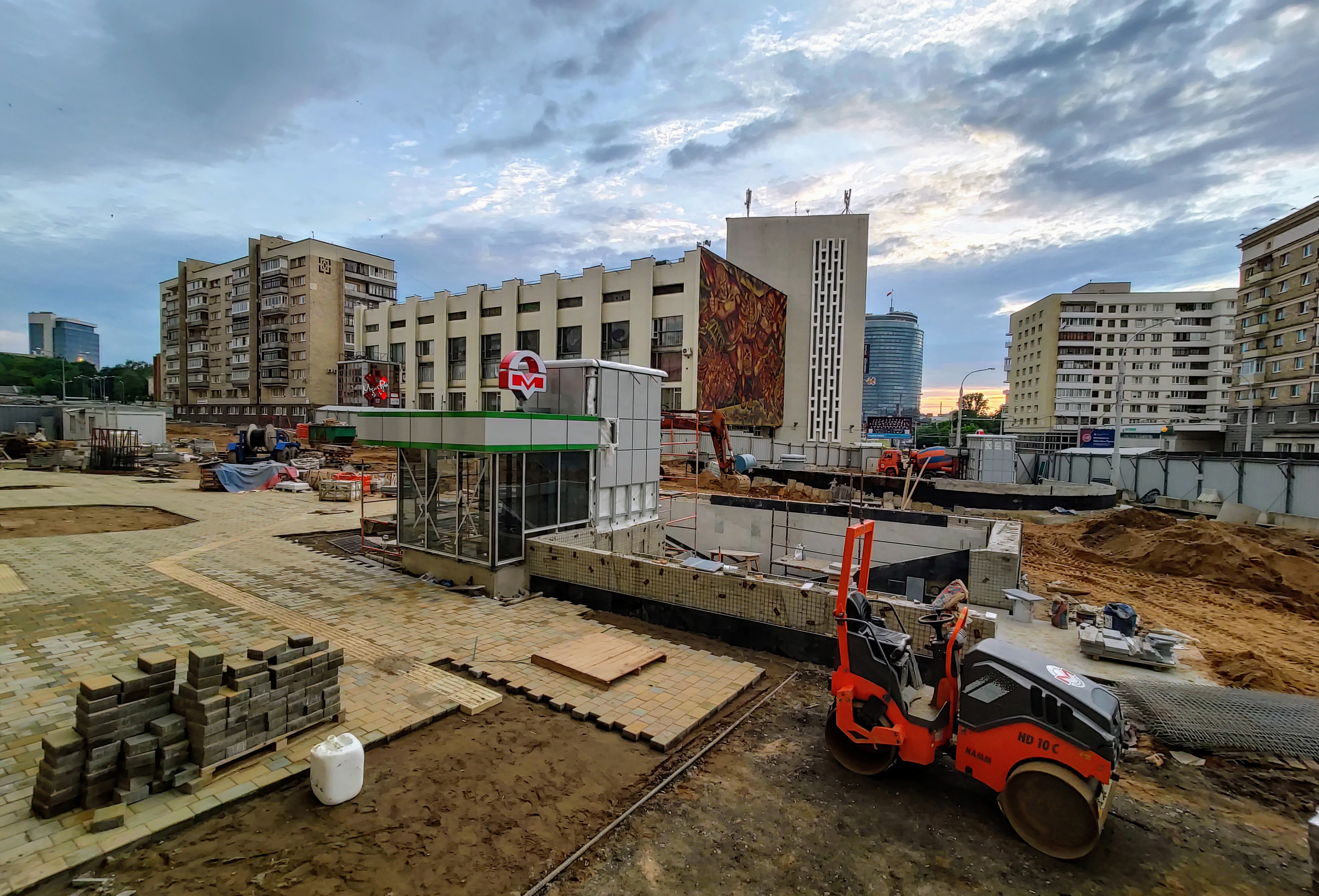
