= Frunzyenskaya (Minsk Metro) =

Minsk Metro station

Frunzyenskaya Фрунзенская
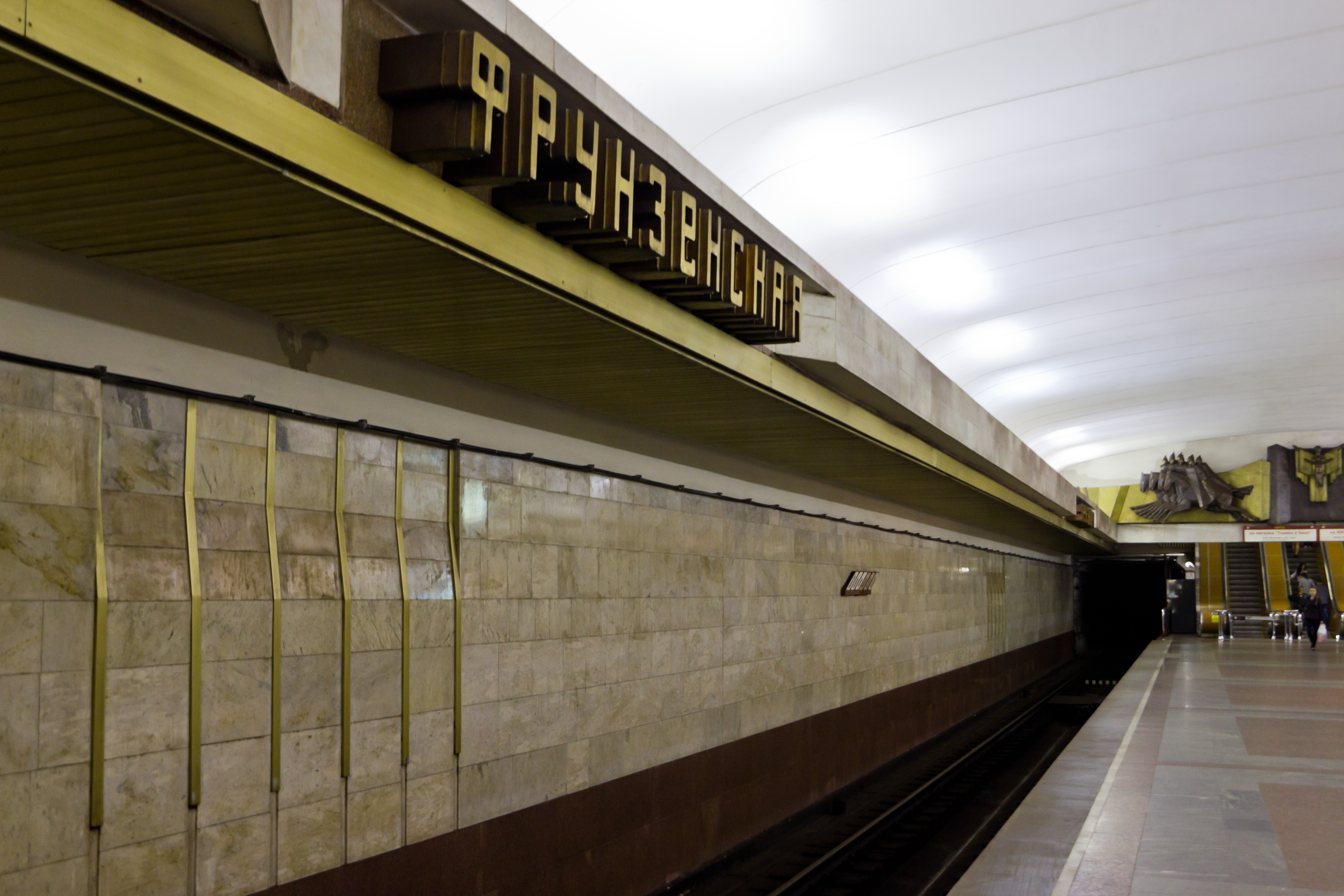
- Frunzenskaya metro station, Minsk; Station Hall

General information
- Coordinates: 53°54′19″N 27°32′22″E
- System: Minsk Metro
- Owner: Minsk Metro
- Line: Awtazavodskaya line
- Platforms: 1 island platform
- Tracks: 2
- Connections: Zelenaluzhskaya line (Jubiliejnaja plošča)

Construction
- Structure type: Underground

Other information
- Station code: 218

History
- Opened: 31 December 1990; 35 years ago

Services
| Preceding station | Minsk Metro | Following station |
|---|---|---|
| Maladzyozhnaya towards Kamyennaya Horka | Awtazavodskaya line | Nyamiha towards Mahilyowskaya |
Transfer at Jubiliejnaja plošča
| Terminus | Zelenaluzhskaya line transfer at Jubiliejnaja plošča | Plošča Franciška Bahuševiča towards Kavaĺskaja Slabada |
Location
- Location within Belarus

Frunzyenskaya (Belarusian: Фрунзенская; Russian: Фрунзенская) is a Minsk Metro station. It was opened on December 31, 1990.

It is a transfer station to the Jubiliejnaja plošča station on the Awtazavodskaya line.

== Gallery ==
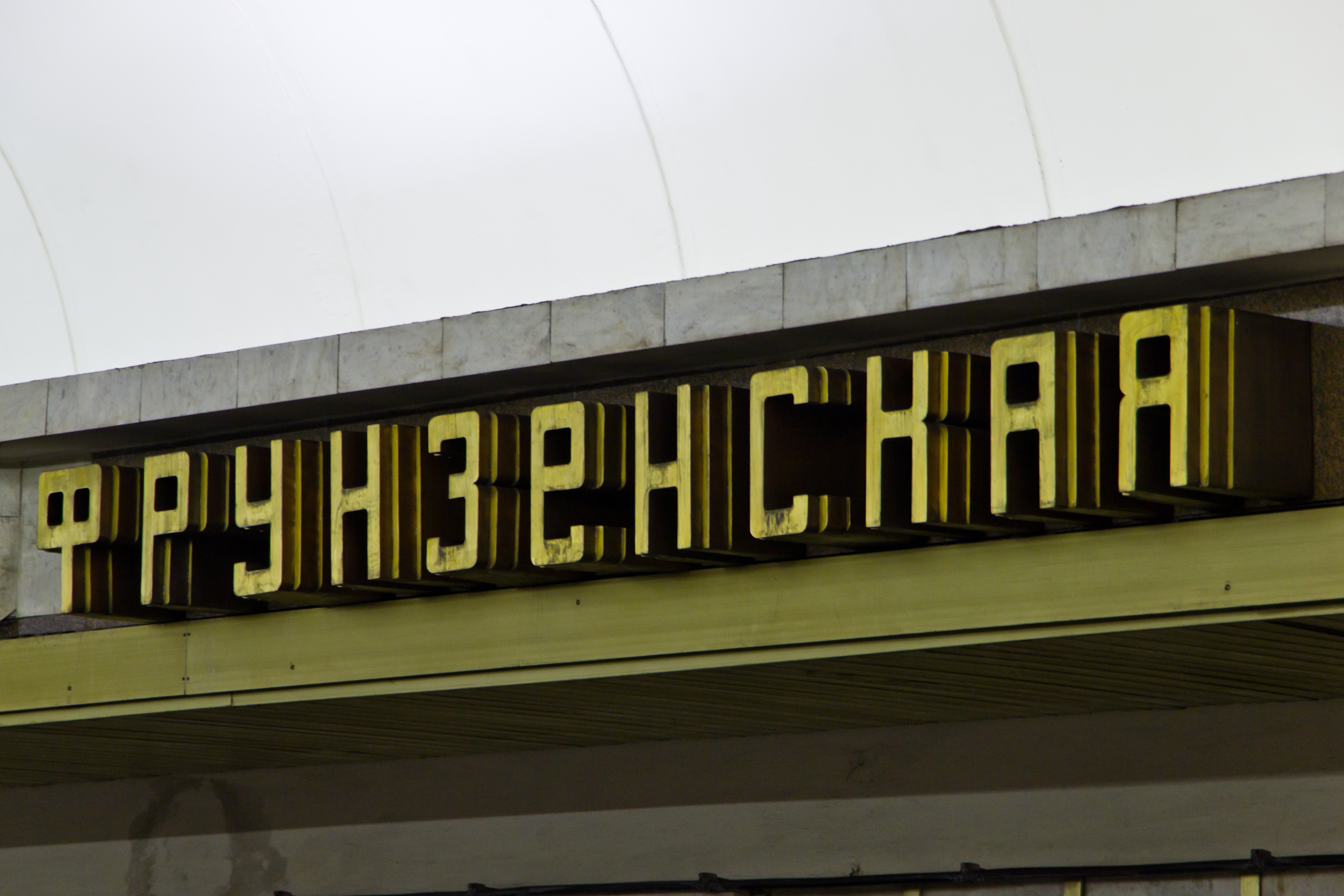

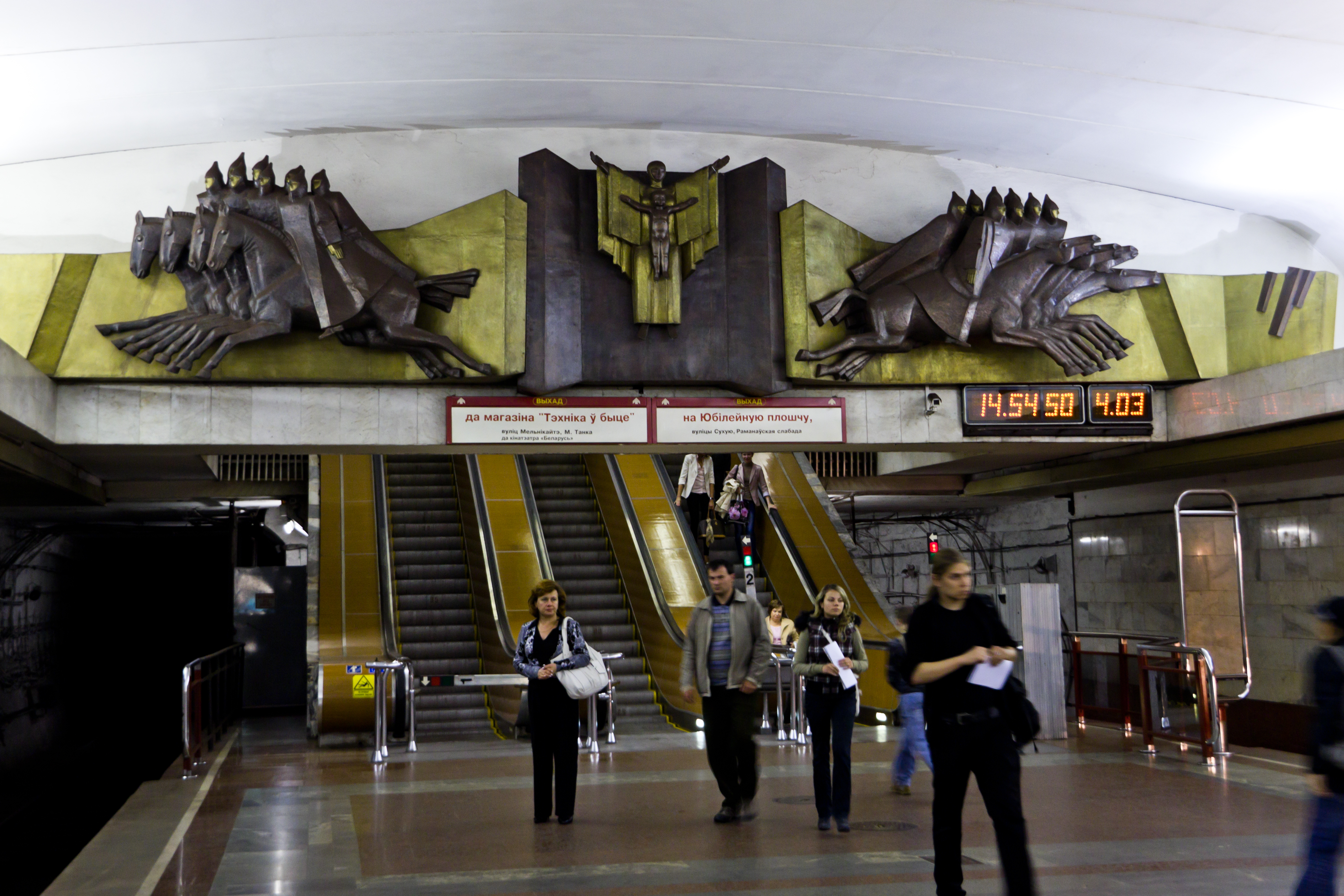

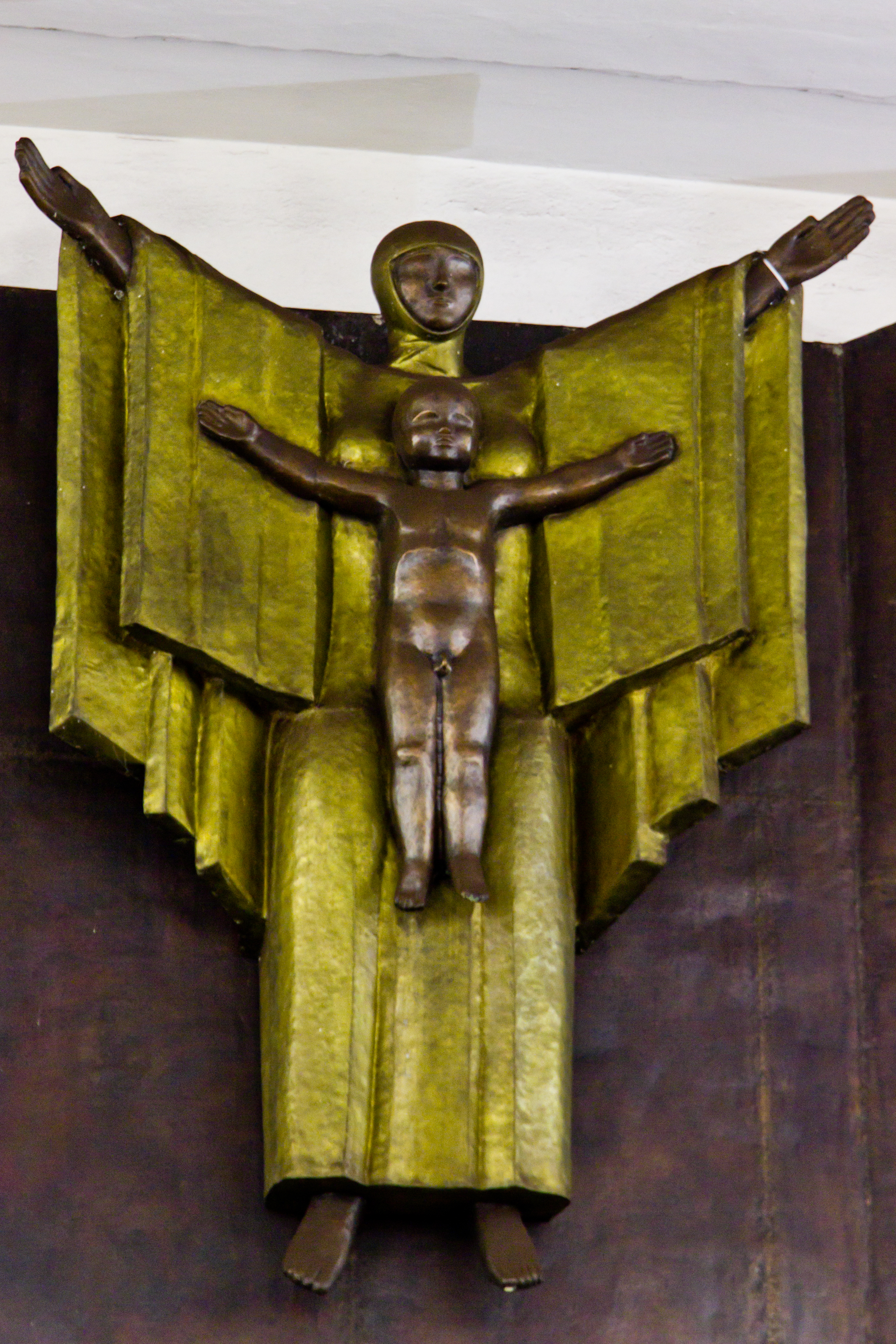

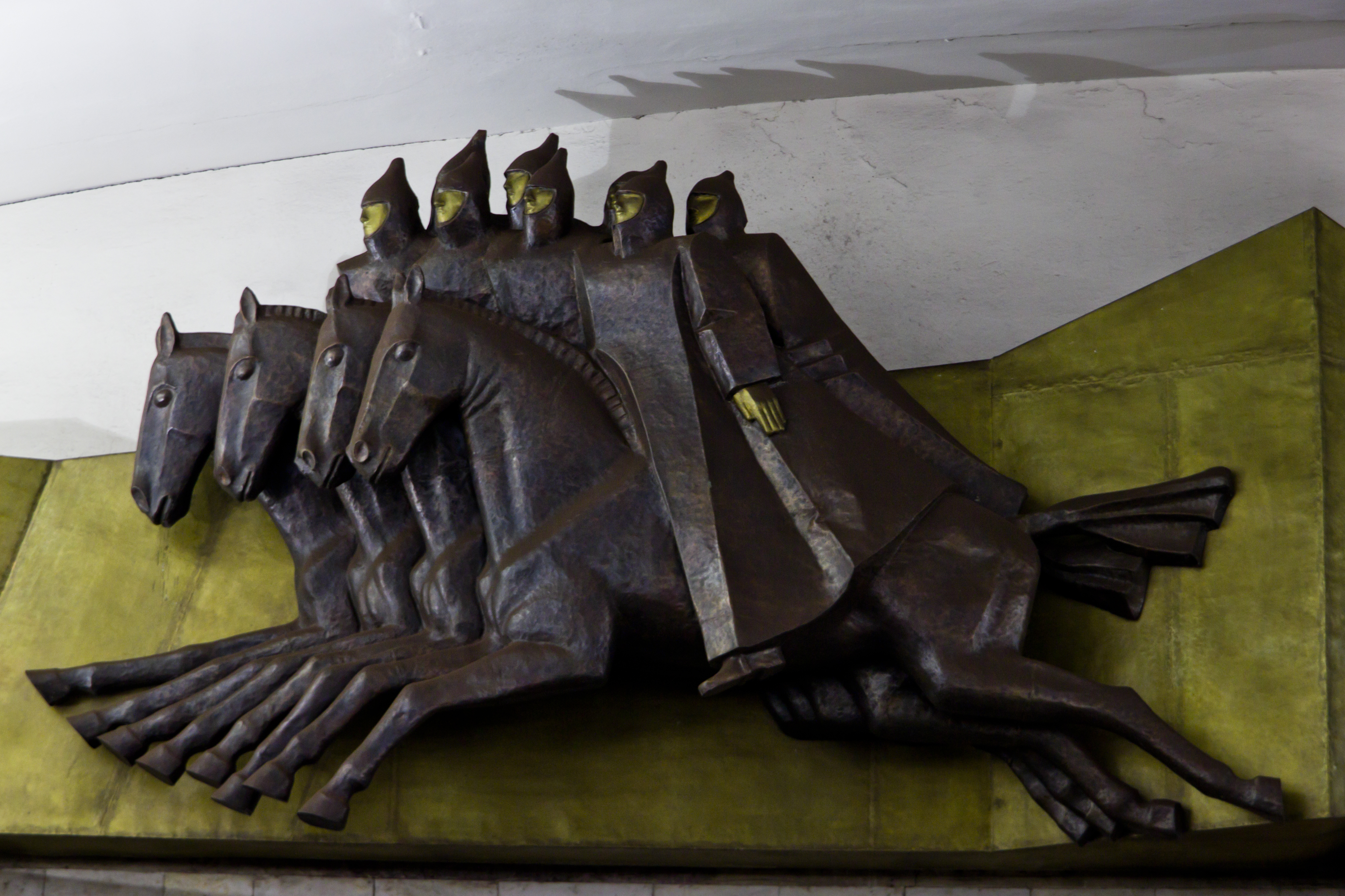

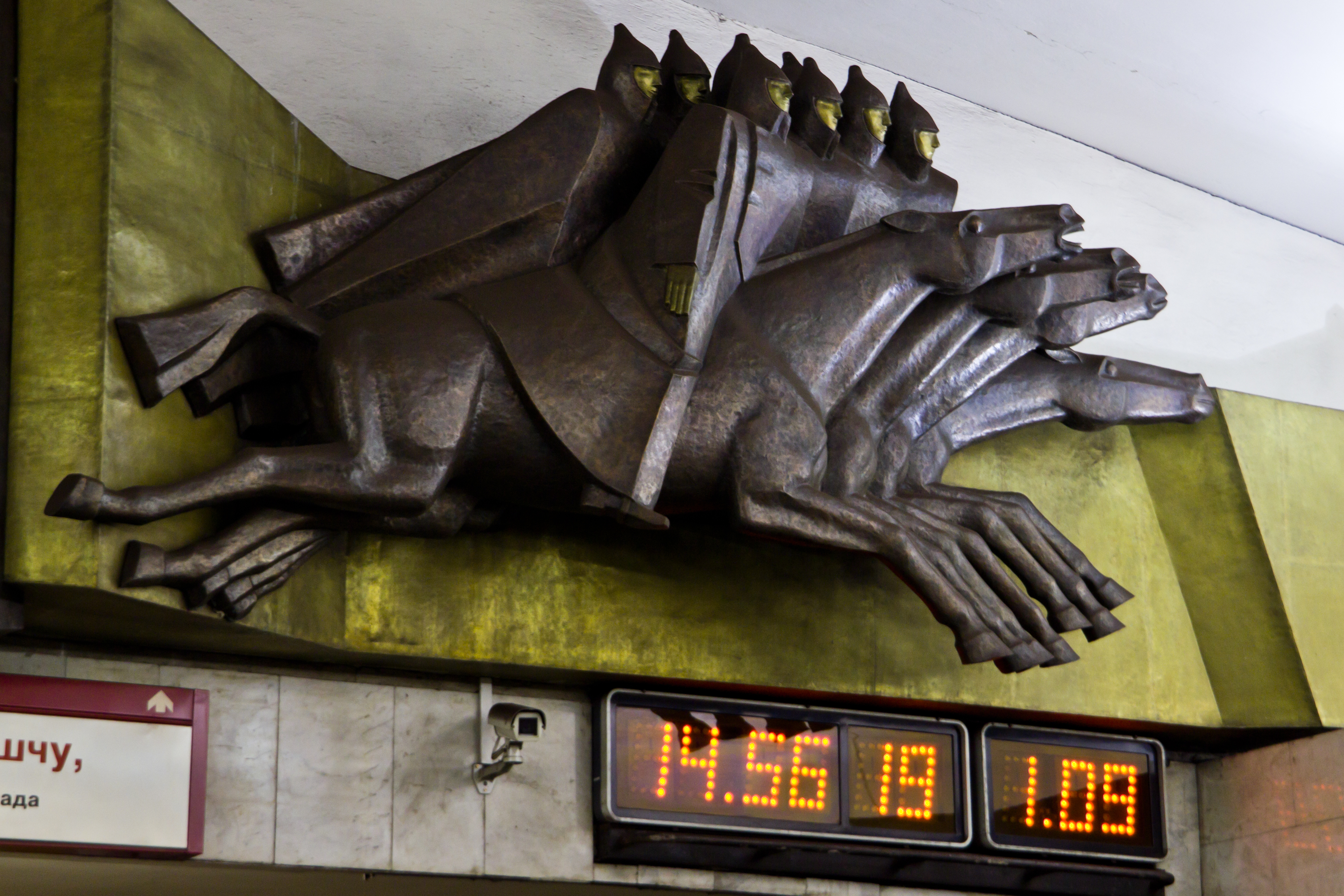

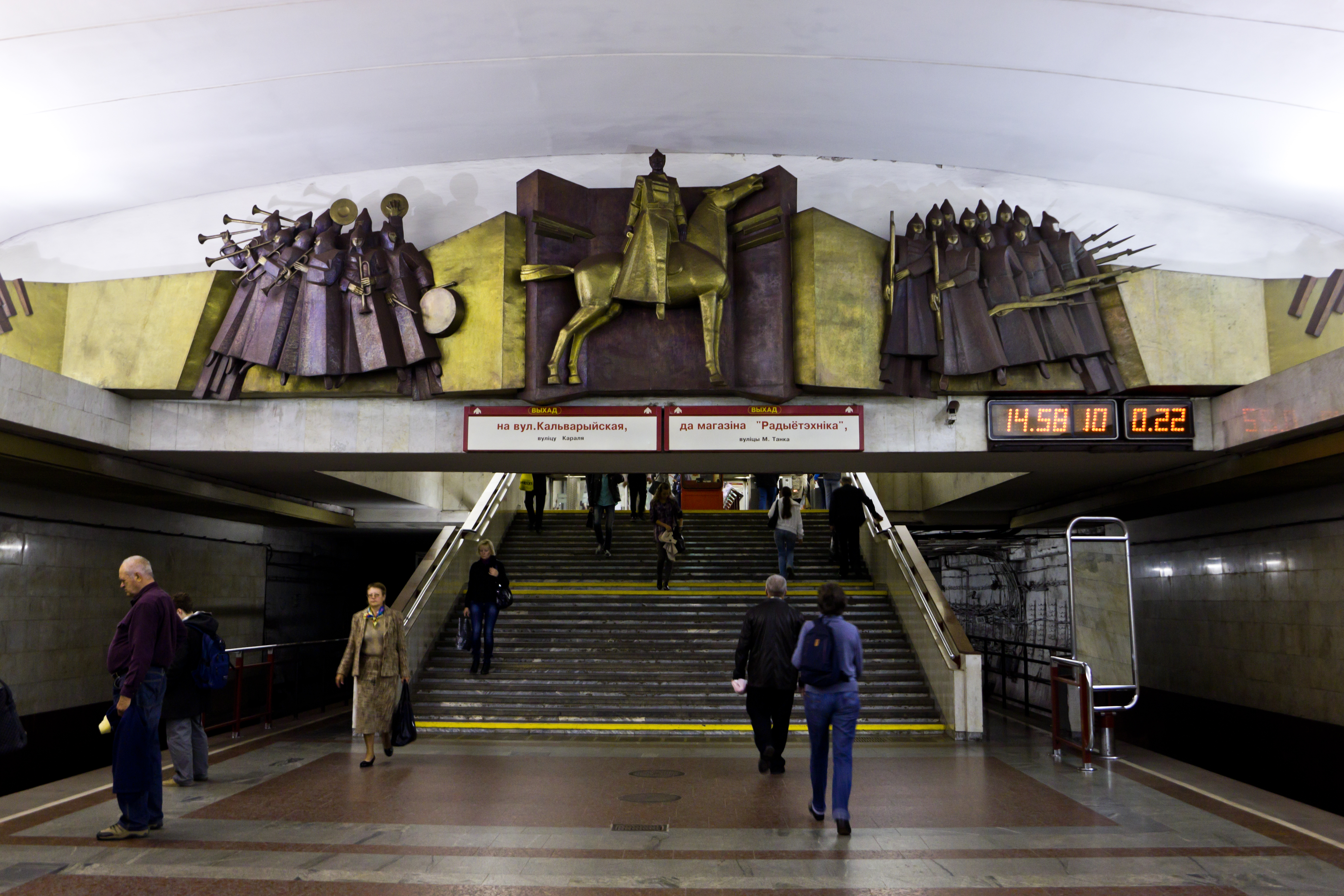

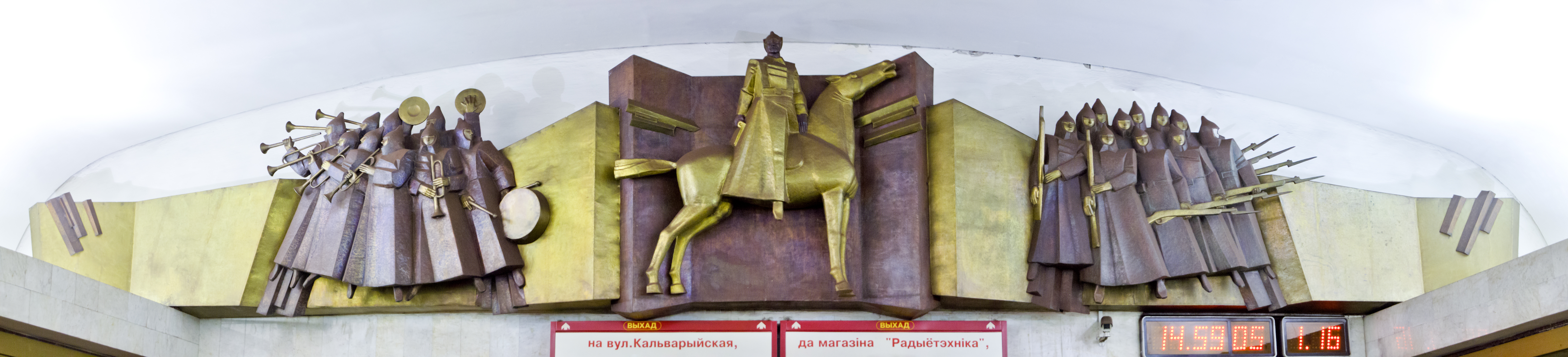
