= List of tallest buildings in Belarus =

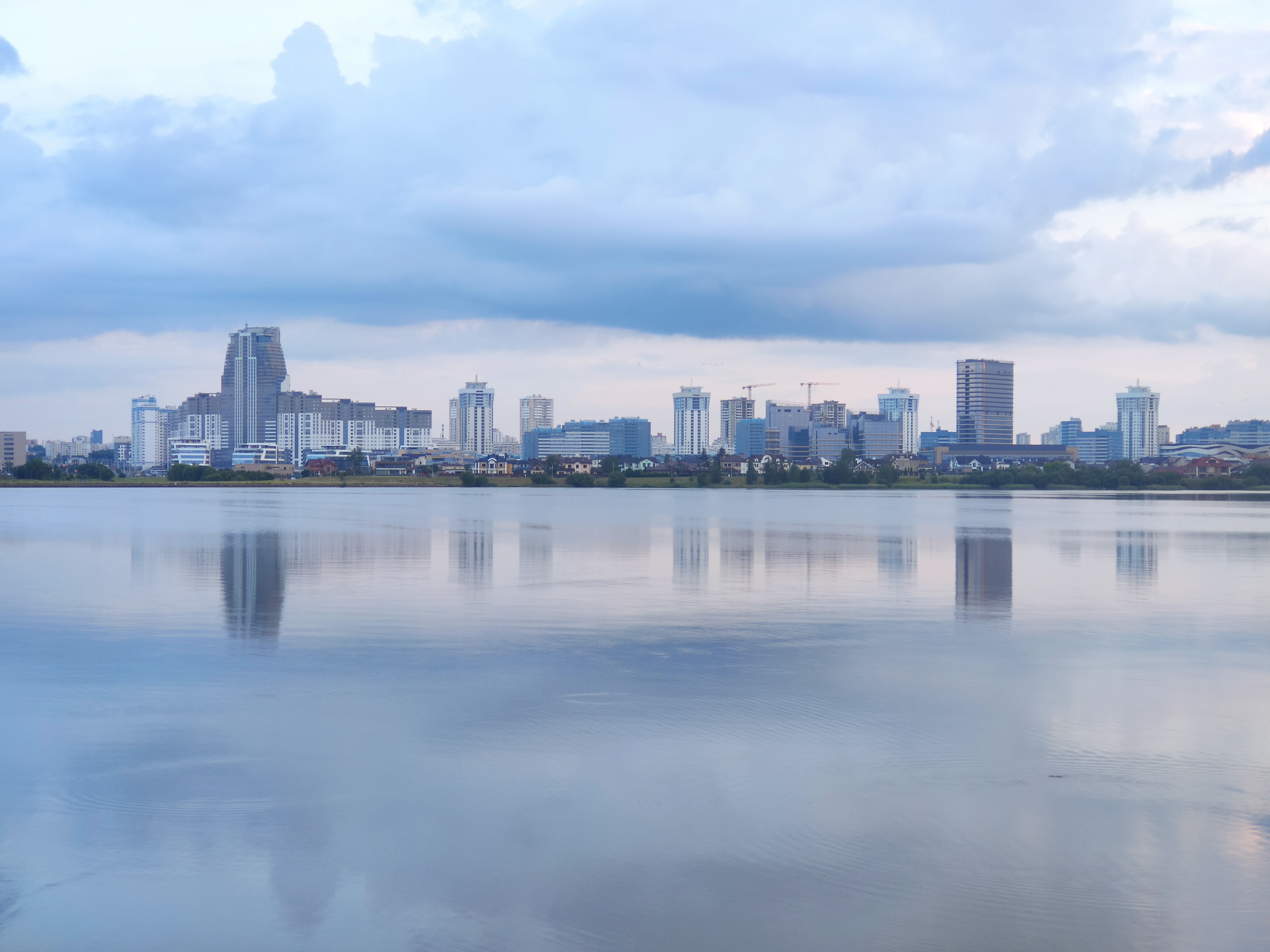
Minsk skyline

The list of the tallest buildings in Belarus includes buildings taller than 50 m in the territory of Belarus. The list is based on two contidions imposed by CTBUH.

- A building can generally be considered tall if it is over 50 meters high or 14 storeys high
- When measuring the height of a building, spires and architectural details are included, but antenna masts are not included.

The list includes the top 11 tallest buildings ever built. Heights have been rounded to whole numbers according to mathematical rules. The equal sign "=" following the rank indicates equal height between two or more buildings in both parameters (meters, floors). If the height is equal in one parameter, the building with the higher value in the second parameter is given a higher position in the table. For equal parameters, the order in the table is given by alphabetical order of name. The list includes only buildings and does not include structures.

== Tallest buildings ==
Was the tallest building in Belarus upon completion
Architecturally topped out but not yet completed

As of 2022, all buildings on the list are located in Minsk.

The tallest structure in Belarus is the Slonim TV Tower, standing at 374 meters. The tallest inaugurated building is the Lazurit residential complex (138.6 meters). The first building in the country to exceed 20 stories was the Belbyttekhproekt building, constructed in 1983. It remained the tallest building in the country until 2008.

=== >90 m ===
Rank	Name	Image	Location	Year	Height m (ft)	Floors	Notes	Reference
1	Minsk International Financial Center		Minsk; 53.86584°N 27.54749°E	2027	168.2 m (552 ft)	42	Tallest building in Minsk and Belarus. Topped out in 2024 and scheduled for completion in 2027. Part of the Minsk Mir complex.	
2	Lazurit Residential Complex		Minsk; 53.93438°N 27.47787°E	2022	138.6 m (455 ft)	37	Tallest building in Minsk and Belarus between 2019 and 2024.	
3	Parus		Minsk; 53.5425°N 27.3158°E	2015	133 m (436 ft)	32	Tallest building in Minsk and Belarus between 2015 and 2019.; Various sources list the building's height as between 132 and 134 meters; due to ambiguity, the listing indicates an "average" height of 133 meters. Various sources list the year of completion as 2014 and 2015; on Yandex.Panoramas for 2014, the building appears completed but is still surrounded by construction fencing; due to ambiguity, the listing indicates 2015 as completion year.	
4	Royal Plaza		Minsk; 53.5428°N 27.3259°E	2014	130 m (430 ft)	32	Tallest building in Minsk and Belarus between 2014 and 2015.; Different sources indicate the year of completion of construction as 2013 and 2014; due to ambiguity, the ltater year of completion is indicated in the list.	
5	Slavic Quarter		Minsk; 53.54444°N 27.3224°E	2012	109 m (358 ft)	29	Tallest building in Minsk and Belarus between 2012 and 2014. Emporis database lists the height as 108.52 as "estimated".	
6	D3		Minsk; 53.5636°N 27.2740°E	2019	105 m (344 ft)	28	Emporis database lists the height as 104.78 as "estimated".	
7	Arkadia		Minsk; 53.5619°N 27.3505°E	2019	101 m (331 ft)	27	Emporis database lists the height of 101.04 as "estimated." The complex includes several individual buildings with identical parameters in the database.	
8	Futuris		Minsk; 53.5628°N 27.4002°E	2019	100 m (330 ft)	25	The building's completion status varies across sources, but Yandex.Panoramas for 2019 shows the building as completed, with no construction fencing, and the adjacent land being used. Therefore, the building is listed as completed.	
9	Cascade		Minsk; 53.5432°N 27.3108°E	2016	97 m (318 ft)	26	Emporis database lists the height of 97.3 as "estimated." The complex includes several individual buildings with identical parameters in the Emporis database.	
10	Shanter Hill		Minsk; 53.94043°N 27.47162°E	2019	92.3 m (303 ft)	25		
11	Belbyttekhproekt building		Minsk; 53.5421°N 27.3232°E	1983	90 m (300 ft)	20	Tallest building in Belarus between 1983 and 2008.	
12	DoubleTree by Hilton Hotel Minsk		Minsk; 53.5429°N 27.3253°E	2016	90 m (300 ft)	21	The building is ranked below the Belbyttekhproekt building based on its height “without rounding”.	

== Under construction ==
Name	Image	Location	Year	Height m (ft)	Floors	Notes	Reference
Gazprom Center		Minsk	2027	189 m (620 ft)	36	Construction began in 2015, was stopped in 2016, resumed in 2018, but stopped again in 2021, and resumed at the end of 2023.	
Residential complex on Mazurova Street		Minsk	2024	74 m (243 ft)	24	Several 24-story buildings.	
