= Minsk Cathedral Mosque =

Mosque in Tsentralny, Minsk, Belarus

- Мінская Саборная Мячэць
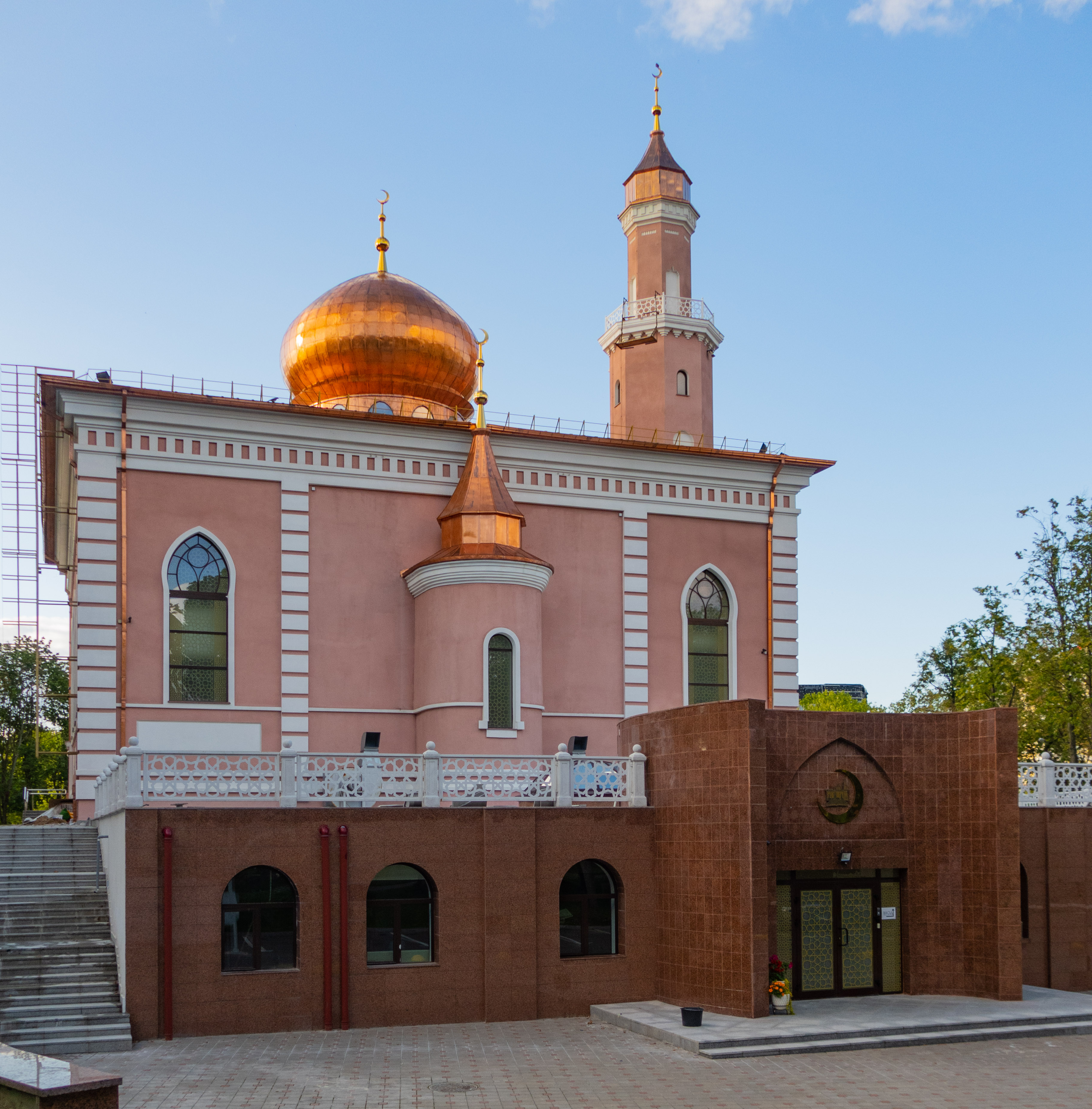

- Location within Belarus

Religion
- Affiliation: Islam

Location
- Location: Tsentralny, Minsk, Belarus
- Interactive map of Minsk Cathedral Mosque
- Coordinates: 53°55′2.03″N 27°31′34.61″E

Architecture
- Type: mosque
- Style: Tatarian
- Established: November 2016
- Groundbreaking: February 2004
- Completed: June 2016

Specifications
- Capacity: 1,500 worshippers
- Dome: 1
- Minaret: 1
- Site area: 2,800 m^{2} (30,000 sq ft)

The Minsk Cathedral Mosque (Belarusian: Мінская Саборная Мячэць, romanized: Minskaja Sabornaja Miačeć) is a mosque in Tsentralny District, Minsk, Belarus. It is the biggest mosque in the country.

== History ==
The construction of the mosque started in February 2004 and completed in June 2016. The mosque was opened in November 2016 in a ceremony attended by President Alexander Lukashenko and Turkish President Recep Tayyip Erdoğan. In December 2019, an Islamic museum was opened in the mosque.

== Architecture ==
With a capacity of 1,500 worshippers, it is the largest mosque in Belarus. The building consists of an Islamic museum and a hall with a capacity of 250 people. It was built on a 2,800-square-metre (30,000 sq ft) site in the Tatarian architectural style.

== Access ==
The mosque is within walking distance north of Maladzyozhnaya Station of Minsk Metro.

== See also ==
- Islam in Belarus
