= Royal Plaza (Minsk) =

Skyscraper in Minsk

General information
- Status: Completed
- Type: Office
- Architectural style: Postmodern
- Location: Minsk, Belarus, 7A Victors Avenue
- Coordinates: 53.9075°N 27.5501°E
- Construction started: 2009
- Completed: 2014

Height
- Roof: 130 m (430 ft)

Technical details
- Structural system: Reinforced concrete
- Floor count: 33

Design and construction
- Architect: Boris Shkolnikov
- Developer: Rubirose International

The Royal Plaza (Belarusian: Небоскрёб Роял Плаза) is a high-rise office building on the Victors Avenue of Minsk, Belarus. Built between 2009 and 2014, the tower stands at 130 m (430 ft) tall with 33 floors and is the current fourth tallest building in both Minsk and Belarus. It was also briefly the tallest building in the country between 2014 and 2015 after it was quickly surpassed by the Parus' topping out.

== History ==
The building is located on one of Minsk's main avenues, on the site of the former Rechenka café next to the Romashka store. Also nearby are the Nemiga metro station, Trinity Suburb, and the Sports Palace.

Construction of the facility began in 2009. However, just as construction began, a crane collapsed. Nearby stores were undamaged, as the impact was glancing, and there were no casualties. The collapse was caused by a failure of the automatic protection system.

Between October and November 2011, the construction was suspended due to a problem with the delivery of glazing from Lithuania. By January 2012, two floors remained to be poured and the spire installed. Completion was planned for late 2012. The Lithuanian company later announced that glass delivery was on schedule.

The tower's exterior glass facade and surrounding area were completed by July 3, 2012, at the request of the authorities. The tower's glazing is 70% complete.

On March 15, 2013, Hurricane Javier raged in Minsk. Its force also affected the skyscraper construction site. A section of the tower's wall fell from the 22nd floor and landed on the roof of a store. Employees and customers were uninjured, and employees added that this was not the first time construction materials had fallen on a store.

The building is constructed in a unified postmodernist architectural style. A spacious lobby was planned for the first floor, retail space on the second, and offices between floors 4 and 30. A restaurant with panoramic views of the city is also planned for the 28th floor. The building's frame is monolithic and beamless. The façade features glass (transparent and ventilated), porcelain stoneware, and granite.

The tower has been deemed a disharmonious structure. It violates the integrity of historical ensembles. However, the Deputy Minister of Architecture and Construction of Belarus stated that it would be appropriate to build an entire skyscraper complex on the Victors Avenue.

== Construction chronology ==
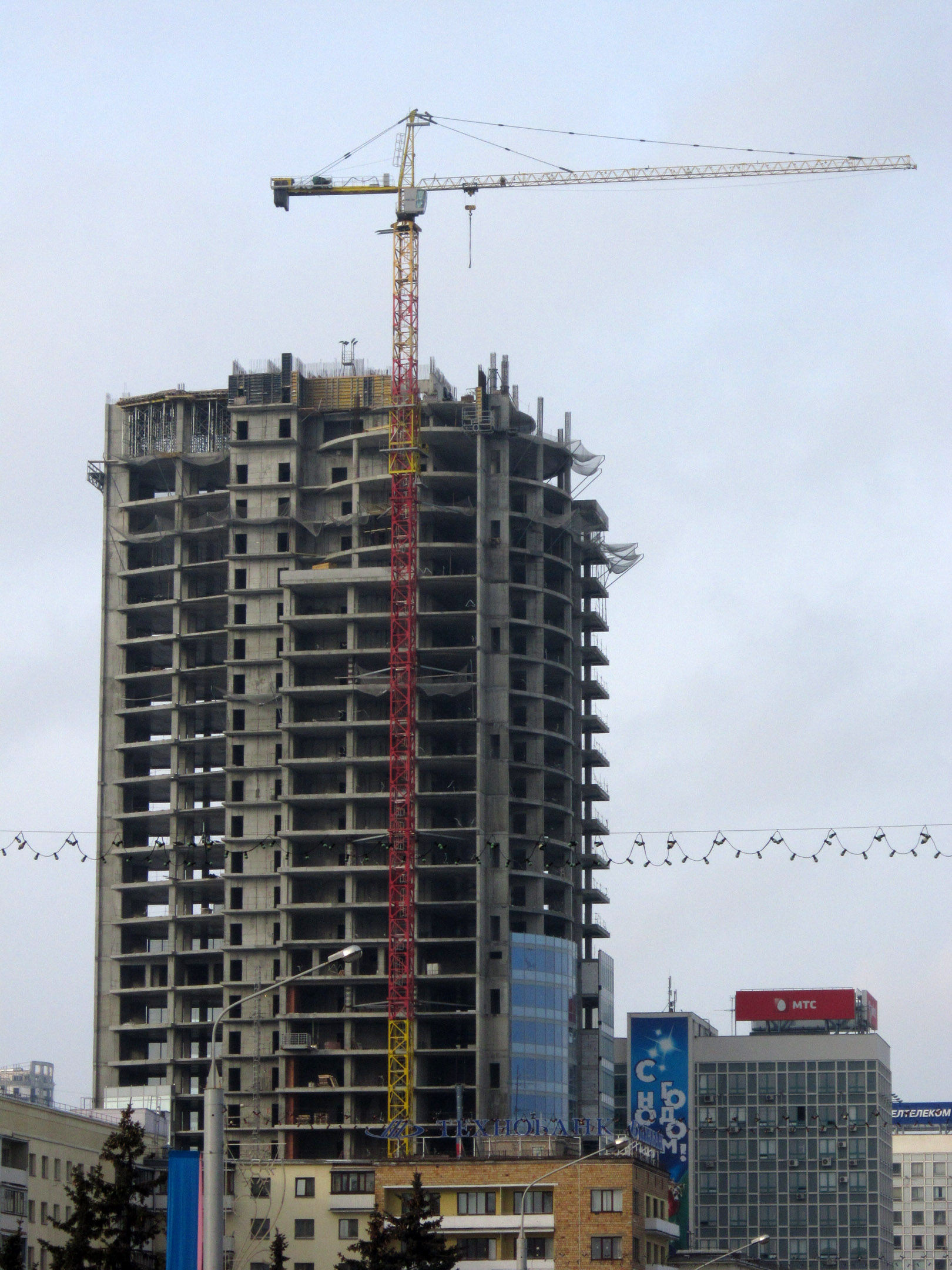
The tower in January 2012...

...in July 2012

...and October 2012

== See also ==
- List of tallest buildings in Belarus

Records
Preceded by Slavic Quarter	Tallest building in Belarus; 2014–2015; 130 metres (430 ft)	Succeeded by Parus
