= Plošča Franciška Bahuševiča (Minsk Metro) =

Minsk Metro Station

Plošča Franciška Bahuševiča Плошча Францішка Багушэвіча
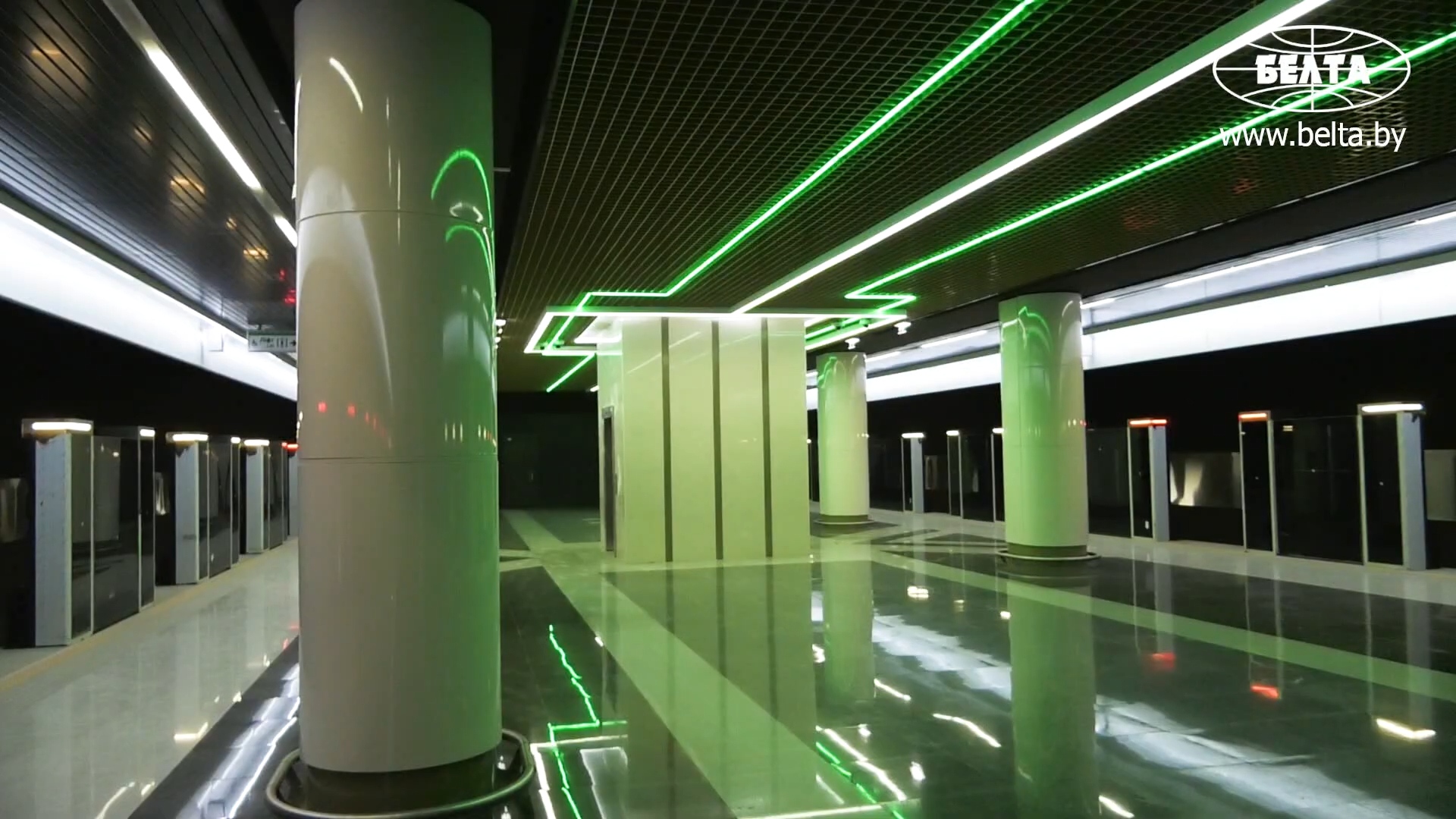
- Plošča Franciška Bahuševiča metro station, Minsk

General information
- Coordinates: 53.8964°N 27.5379°E
- System: Minsk Metro
- Owner: Minsk Metro
- Line: Zelenaluzhskaya line
- Platforms: 1 island platform
- Tracks: 2

Construction
- Structure type: Underground

Other information
- Station code: 315

History
- Opened: 6 November 2020; 5 years ago

Services
Preceding station	Minsk Metro	Following station
Jubiliejnaja plošča Terminus	Zelenaluzhskaya line	Vakzaĺnaja towards Kavaĺskaja Slabada
Location
- Location within Belarus

Plošča Franciška Bahuševiča (Belarusian: Плошча Францішка Багушэвіча; Russian: Площадь Франтишка Богушевича) is a Minsk Metro station. It is located on the square of the same name. The station was opened on November 6, 2020.

== Gallery ==
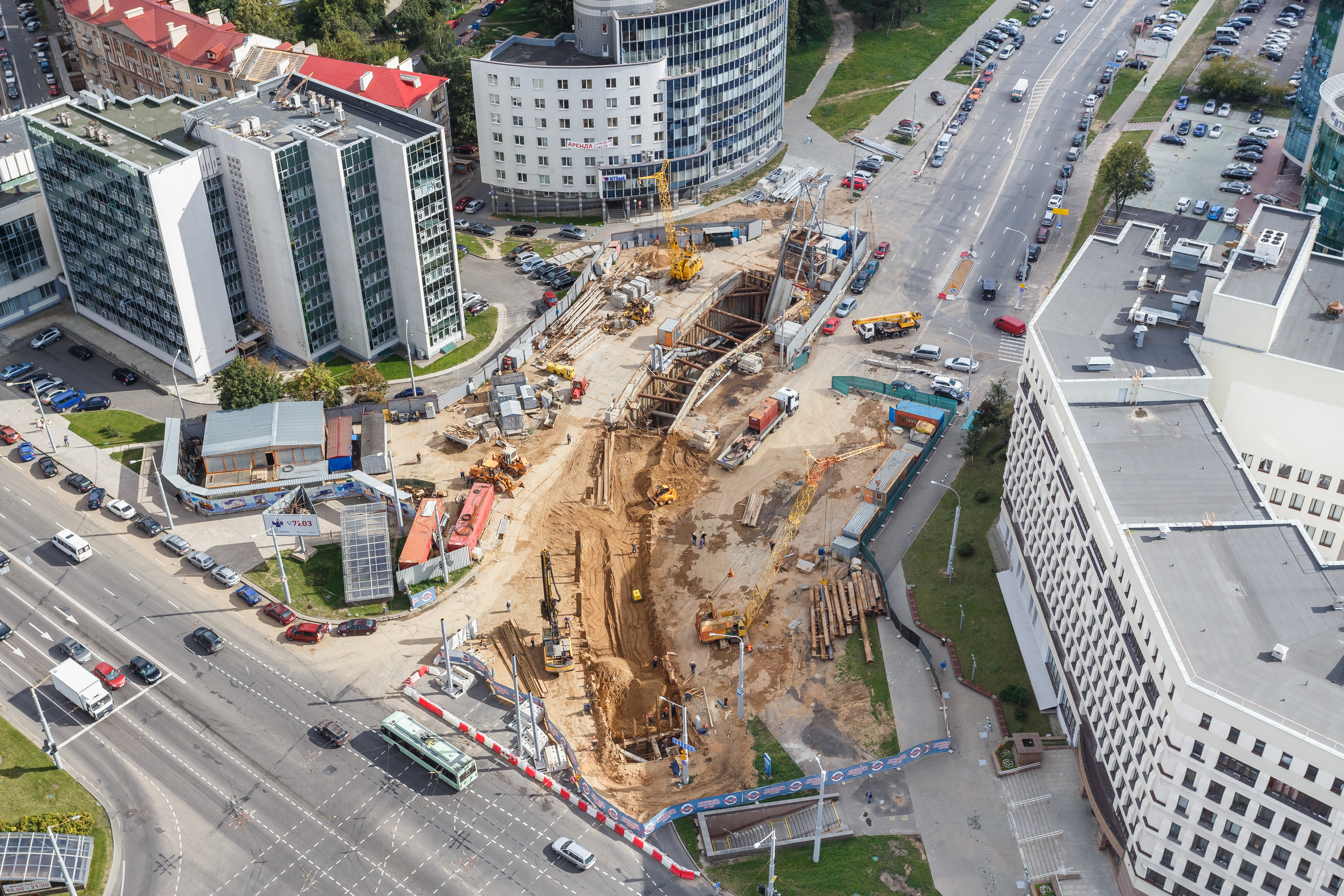
Construction in 2016

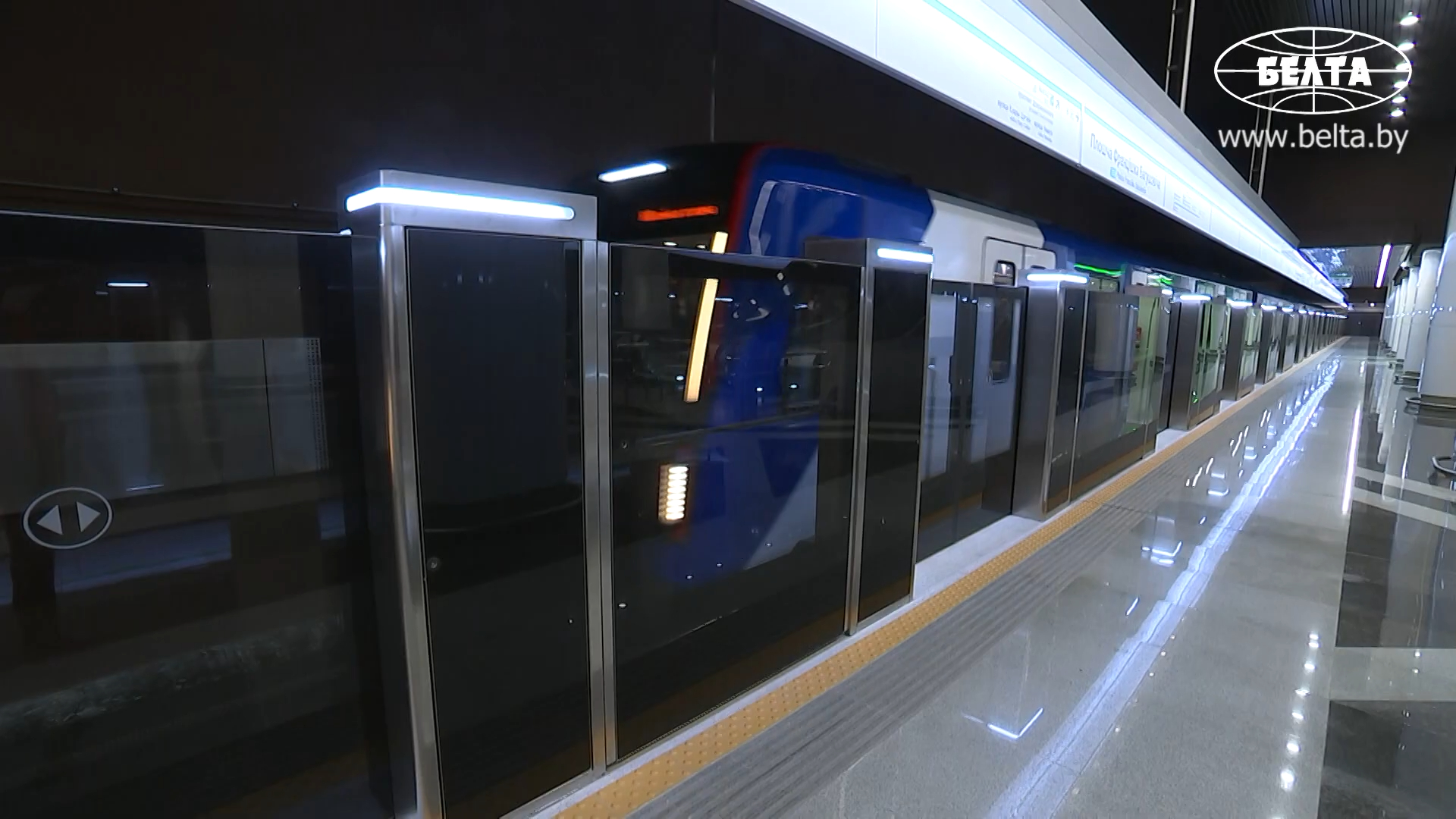

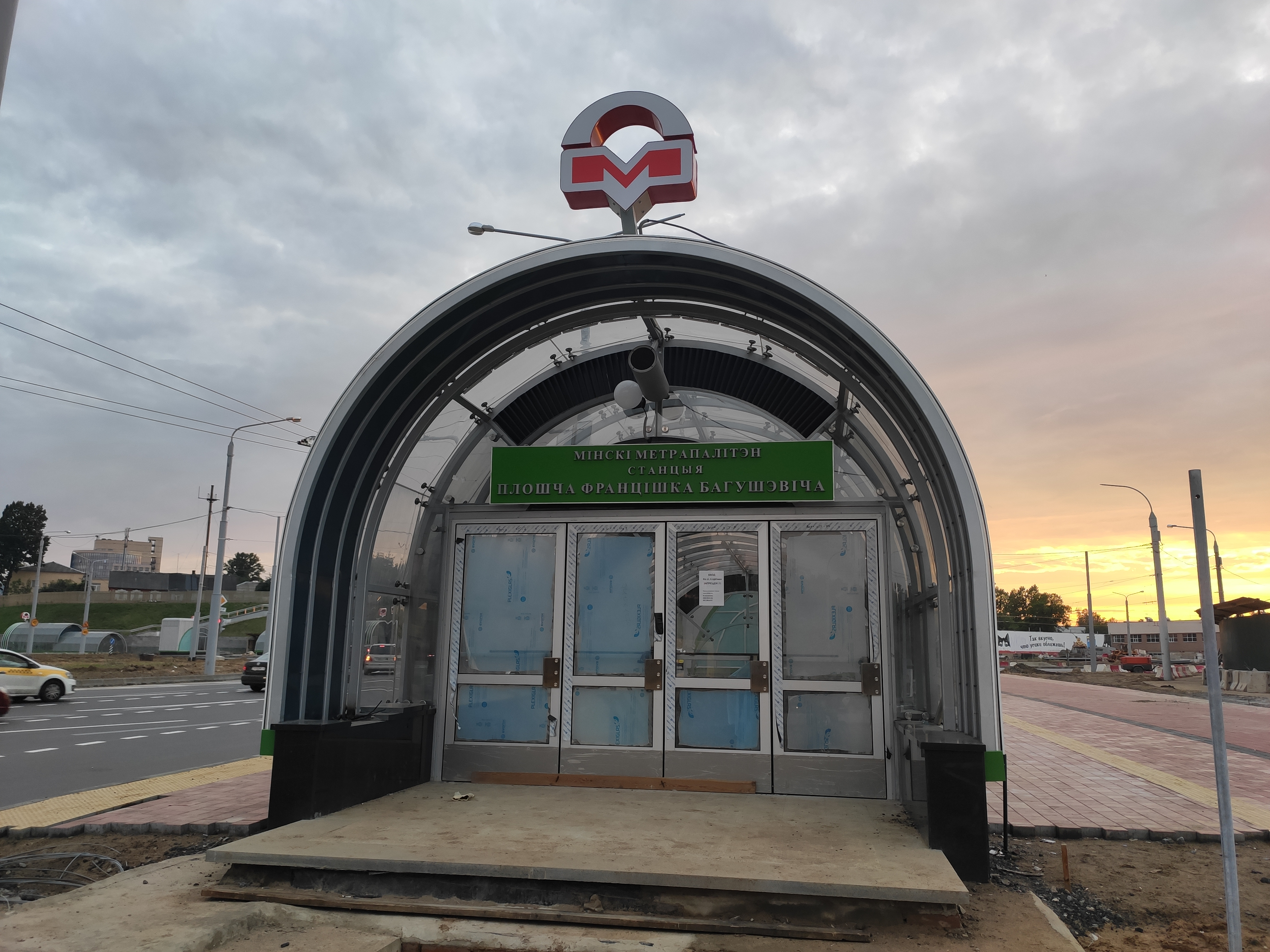
