= Maladzyozhnaya (Minsk Metro) =

Minsk Metro station

Maladzyozhnaya Маладзёжная
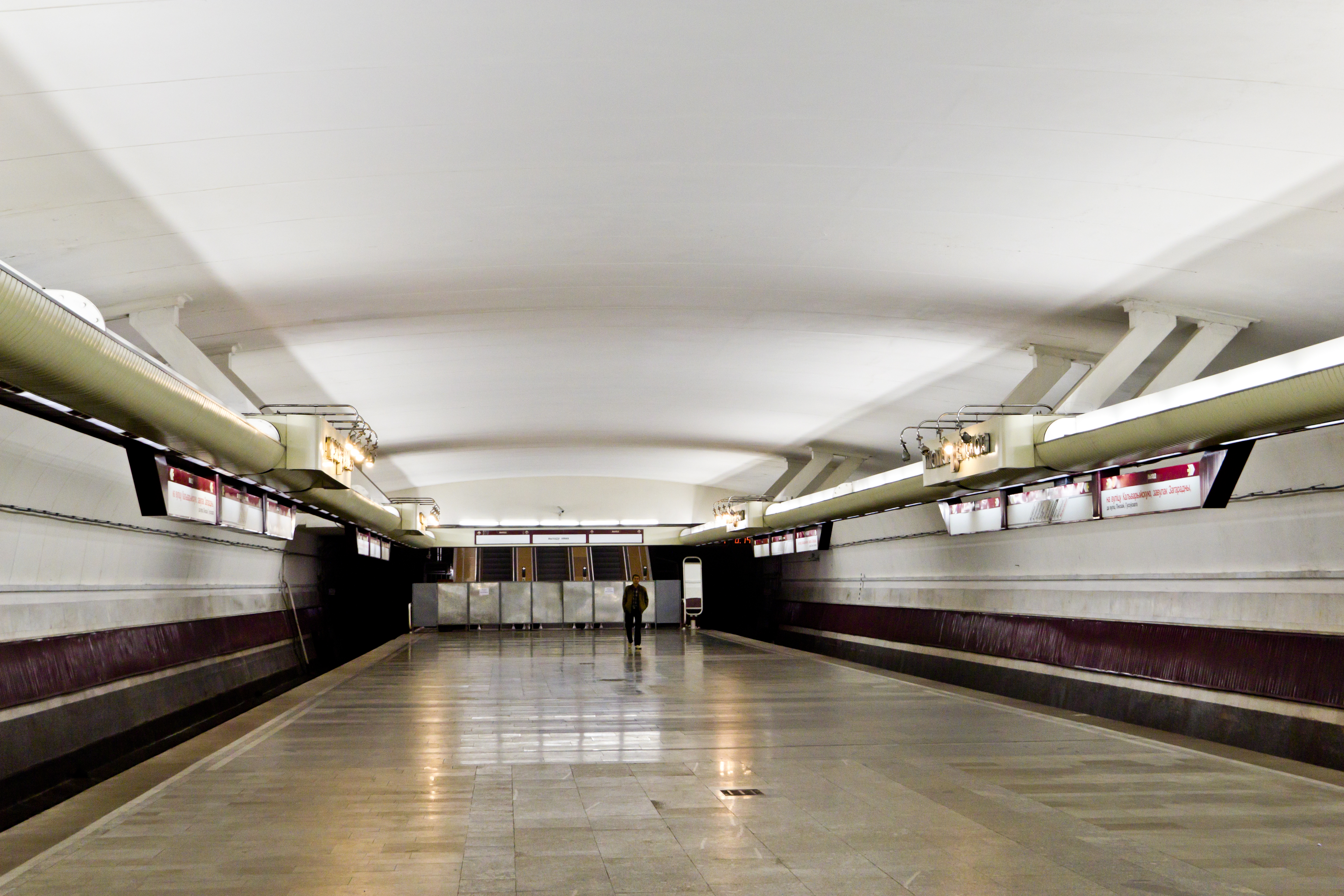
- Station Hall

General information
- Coordinates: 53°54′23″N 27°31′16″E
- System: Minsk Metro
- Owner: Minsk Metro
- Line: Awtazavodskaya line
- Platforms: 1 island platform
- Tracks: 2

Construction
- Structure type: Underground

Other information
- Station code: 219

History
- Opened: 3 July 1995; 31 years ago

Services
Preceding station	Minsk Metro	Following station
Pushkinskaya towards Kamyennaya Horka	Awtazavodskaya line	Frunzyenskaya towards Mahilyowskaya
Location
- Location within Belarus

Maladzyozhnaya (Belarusian: Маладзёжная; Russian: Молодёжная) is a Minsk Metro station in Minsk, Belarus. It opened on July 3, 1995.

== Around the station ==
- Minsk Cathedral Mosque

== Gallery ==
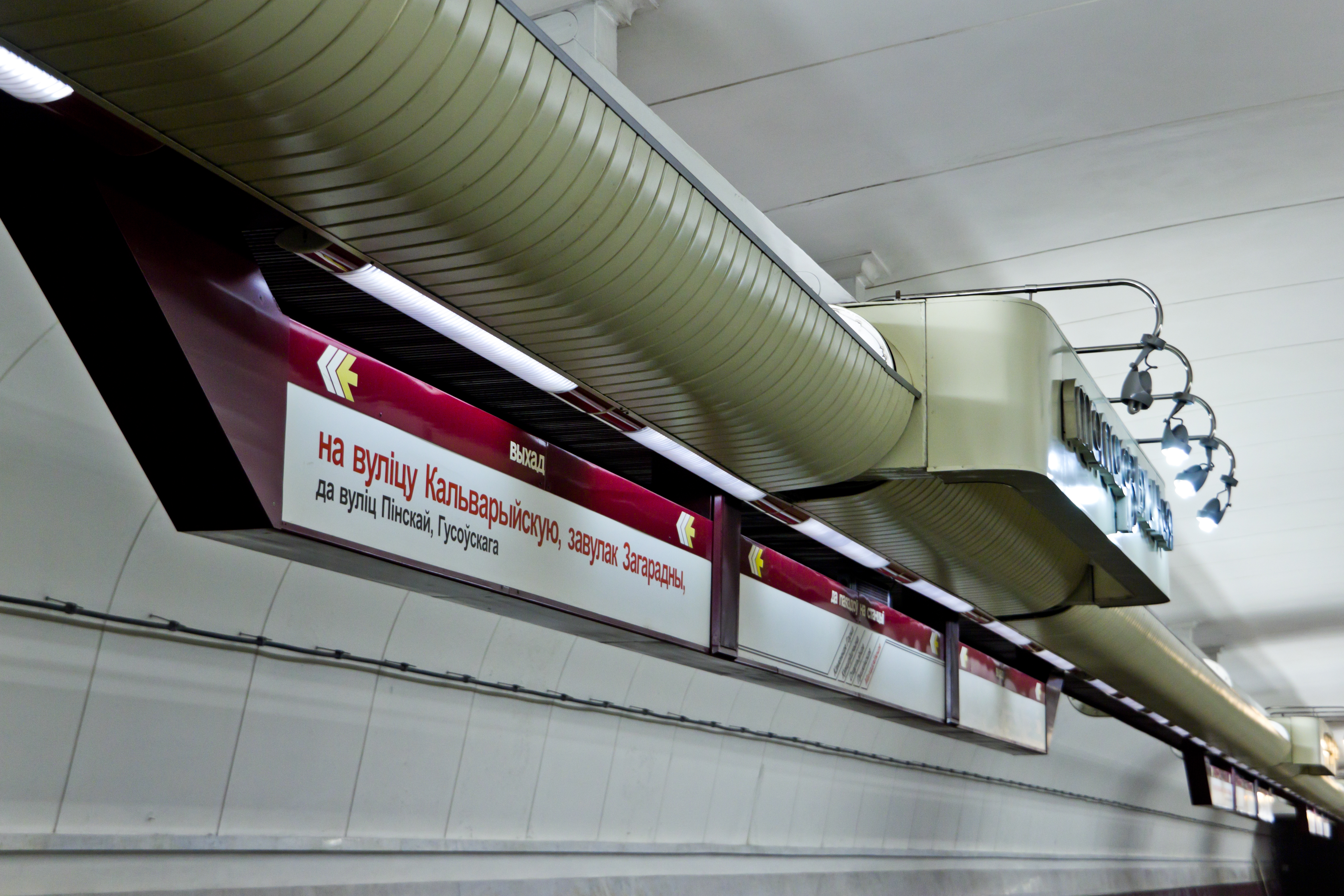
Western Exit

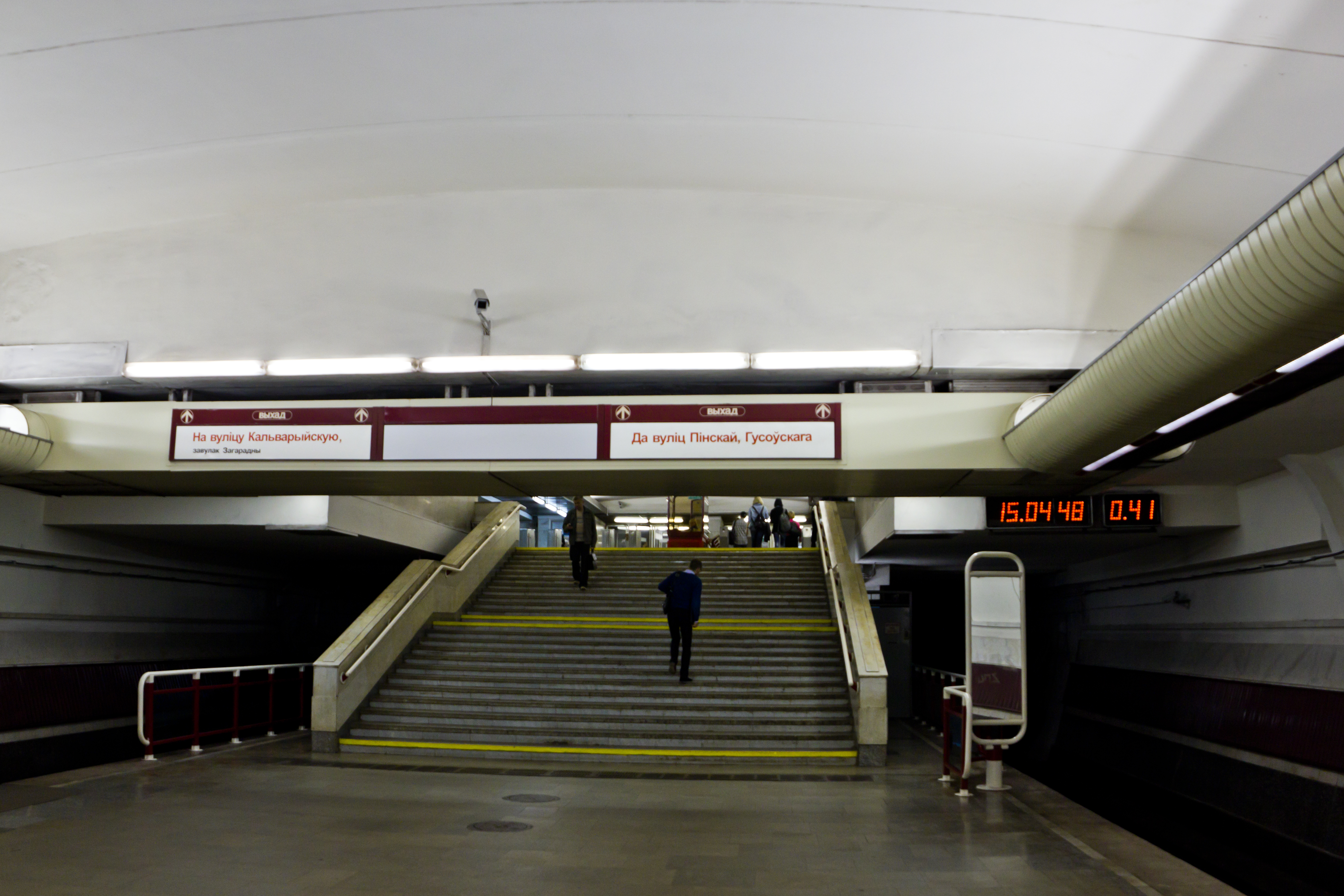
Station Signage

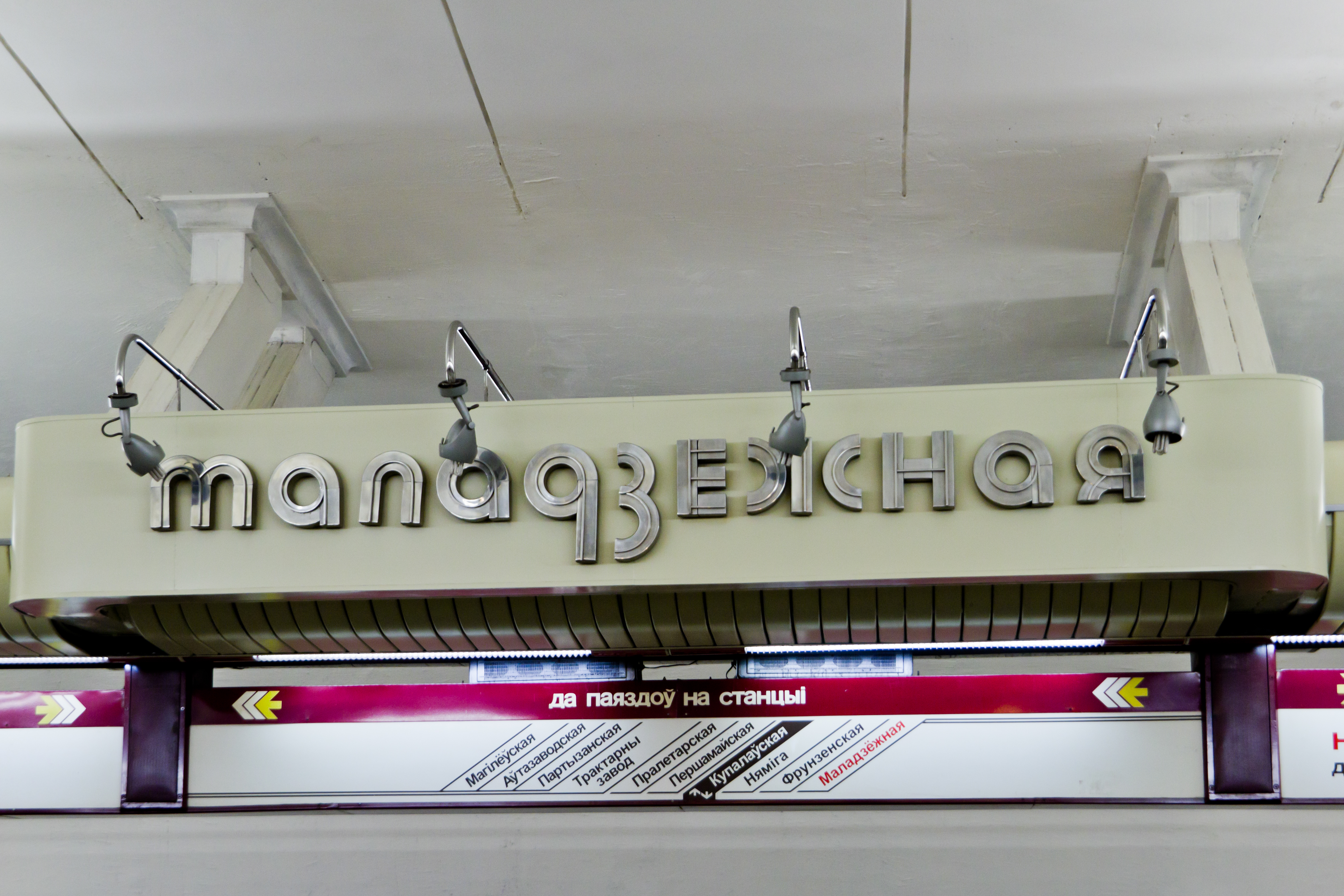
