= Maskoŭskaja =

Maskowskaya or Maskoŭskaja may refer to:

- Maskowskaya line on the Minsk Metro
  - Maskoŭskaja (Minsk Metro), a station on the line

== See also ==
- or
- or
