= Park Čaliuskincaŭ (Minsk Metro) =

Minsk Metro station

Park Čaliuskincaŭ Парк Чалюскінцаў
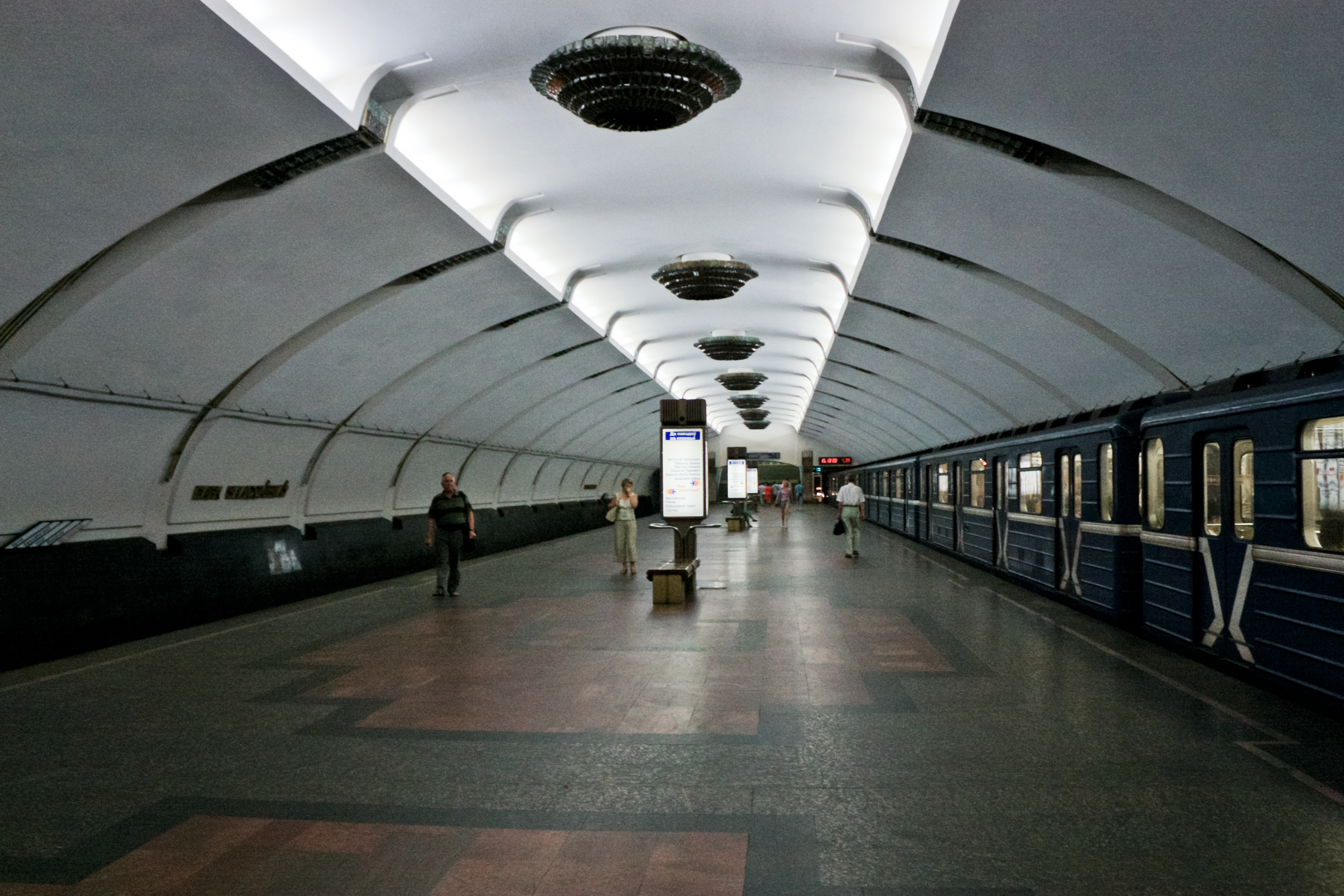
- Park Čaliuskincaŭ station hall

General information
- Coordinates: 53.9242°N 27.6132°E
- System: Minsk Metro
- Owner: Minsk Metro
- Line: Maskoŭskaja line
- Platforms: 1 island platform
- Tracks: 2

Construction
- Structure type: Underground

Other information
- Station code: 120

History
- Opened: 30 June 1984; 42 years ago

Services
Preceding station	Minsk Metro	Following station
Maskoŭskaja towards Uručča	Maskoŭskaja line	Akademiya Navuk towards Malinawka
Location
- Location within Belarus

Park Čaliuskincaŭ (Belarusian: Парк Чалюскінцаў, Russian: Парк Челюскинцев) is a Minsk Metro station on the North Eastearn side of Minsk, Belarus. It was built during the Soviet era and opened on June 30, 1984.

The station entrance is located on Praspiekt. Niezaliežnasci near Park Chalyuskintsaw and close to the Children's Railroad.

== Gallery ==
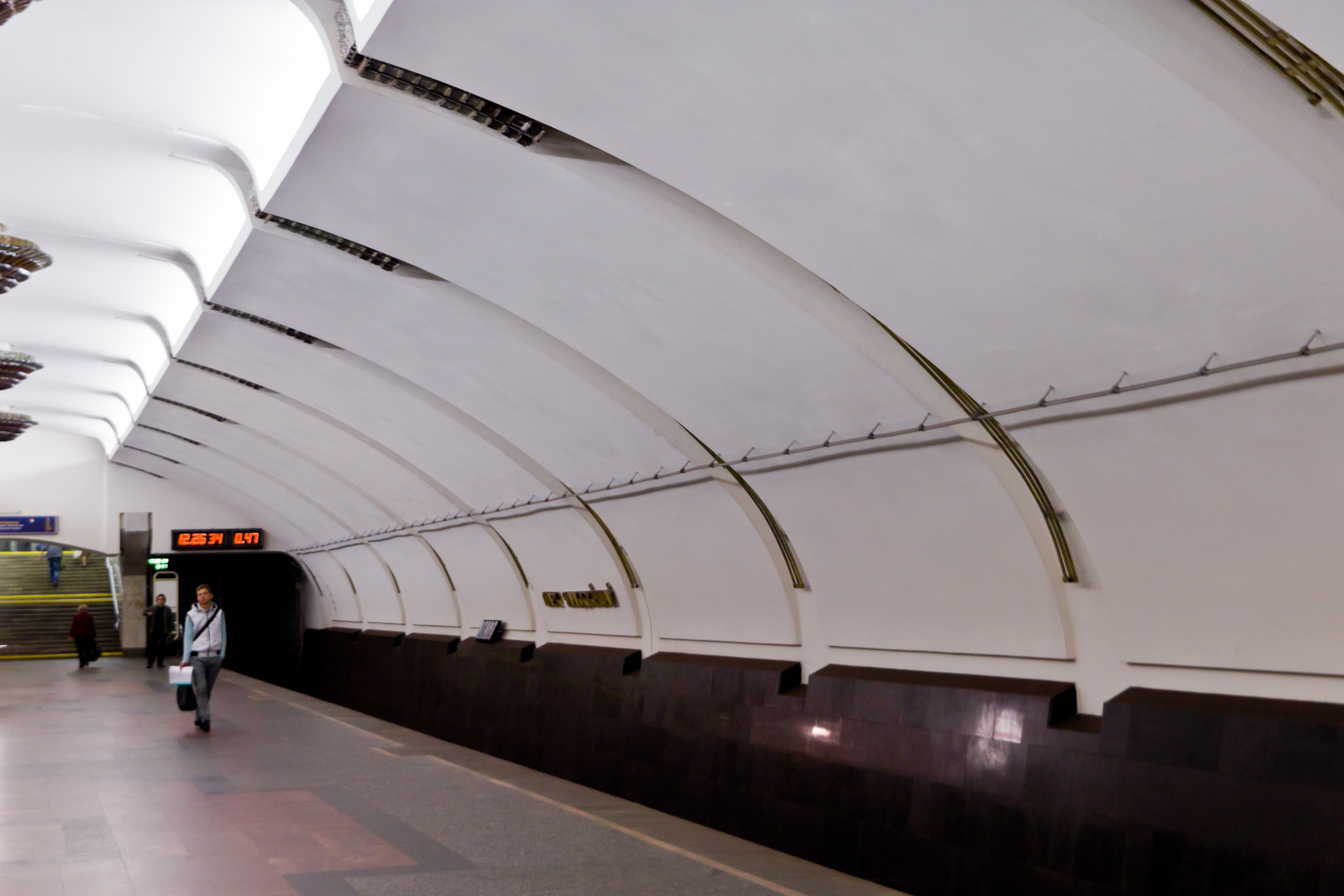

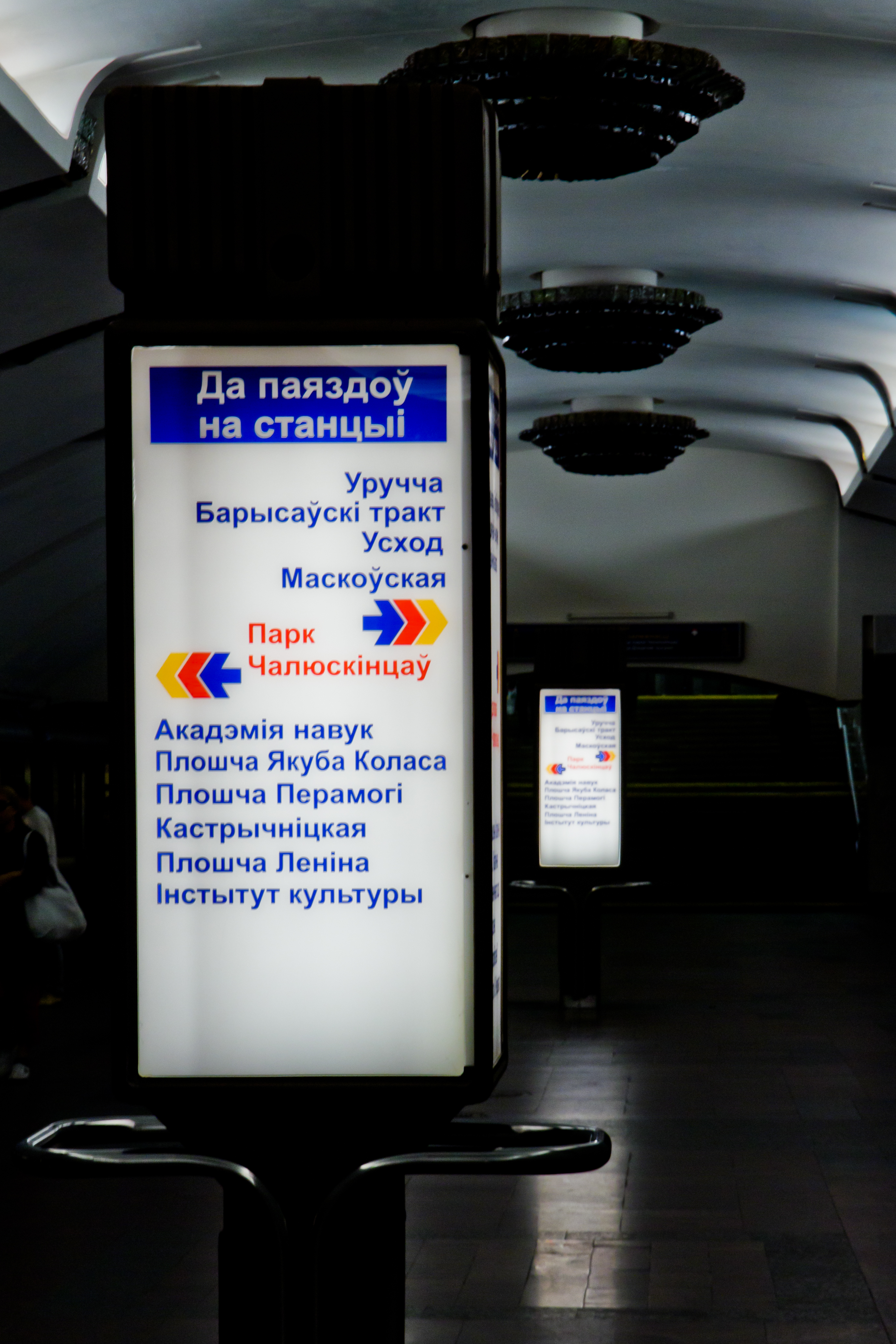

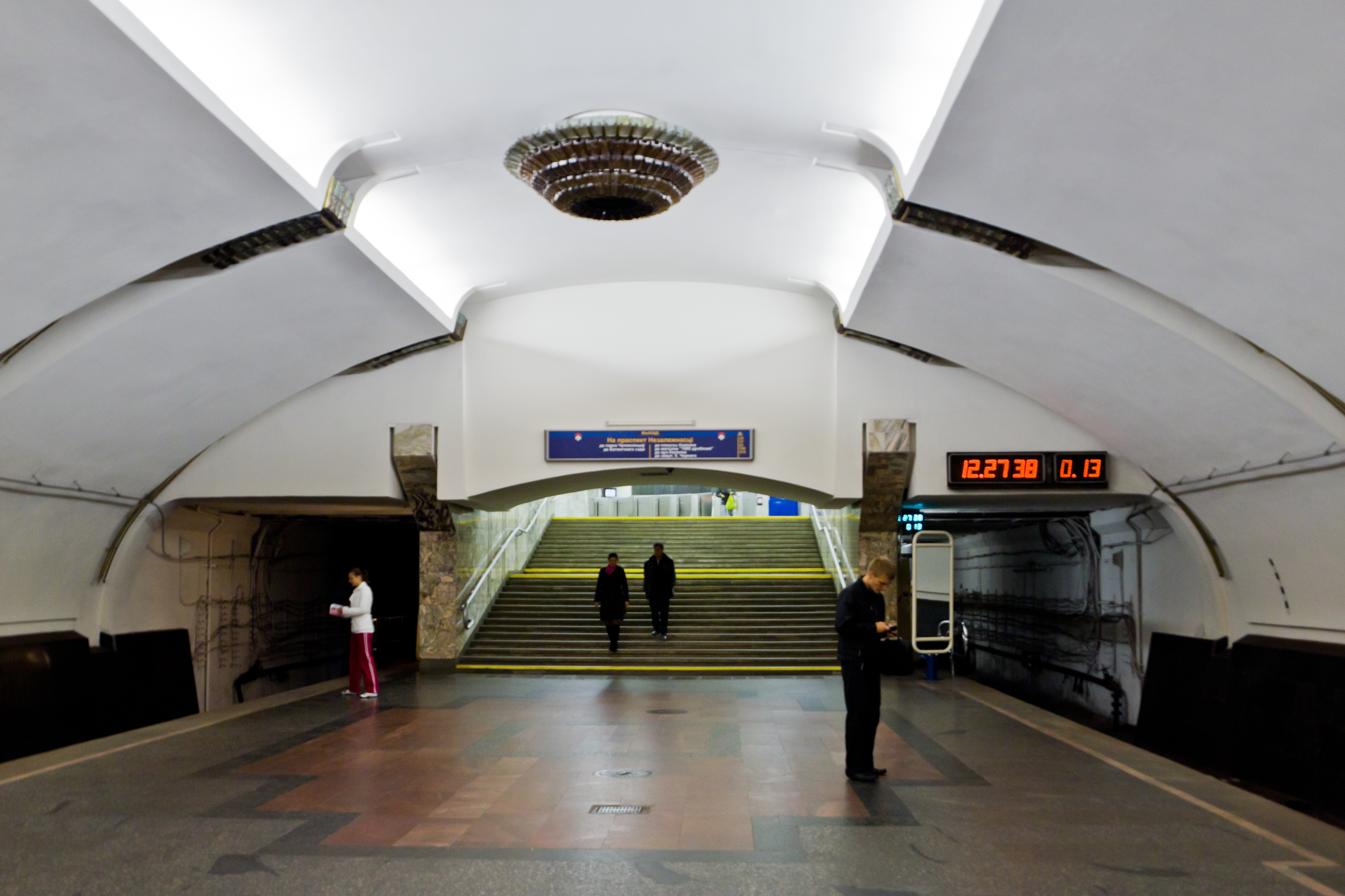

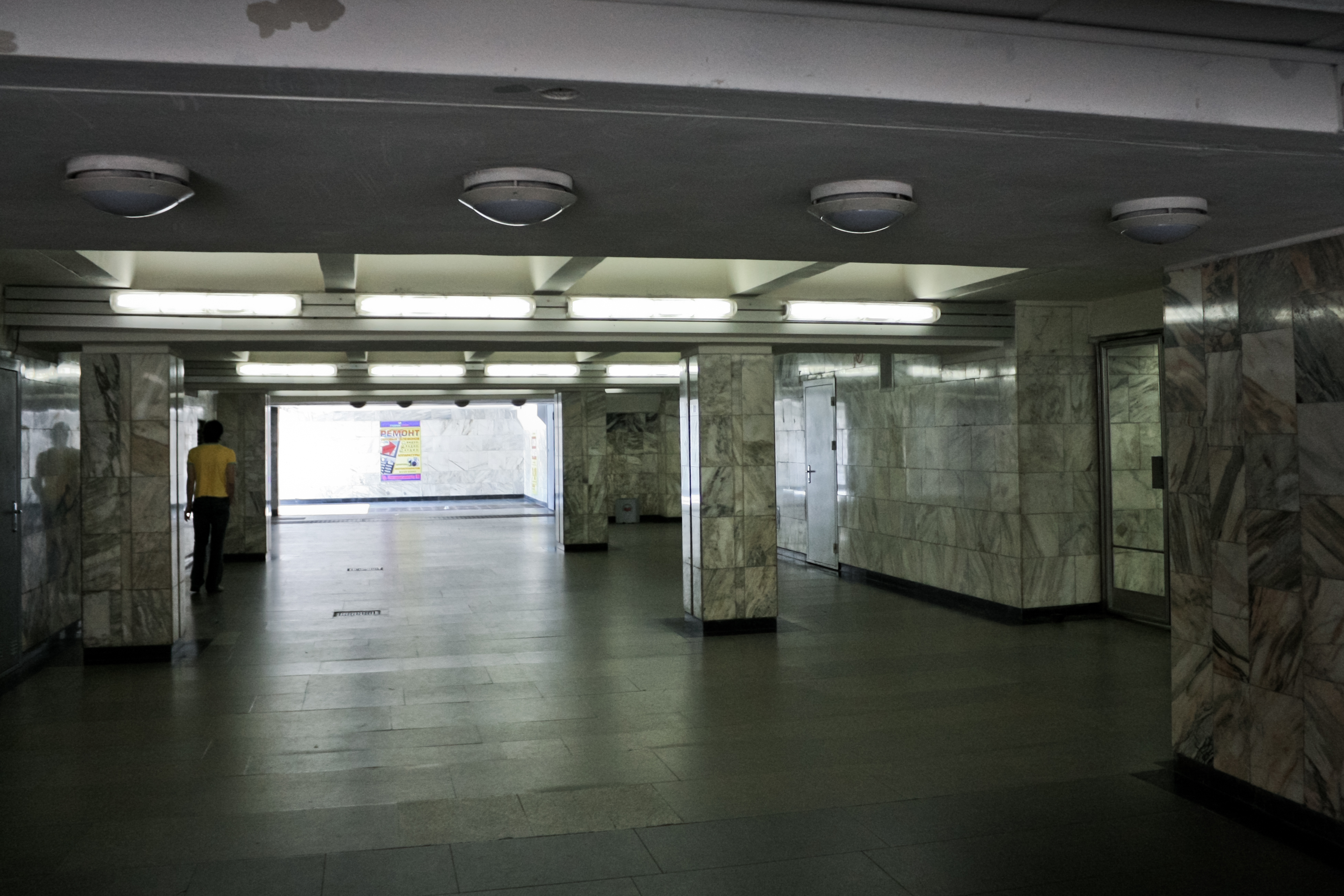

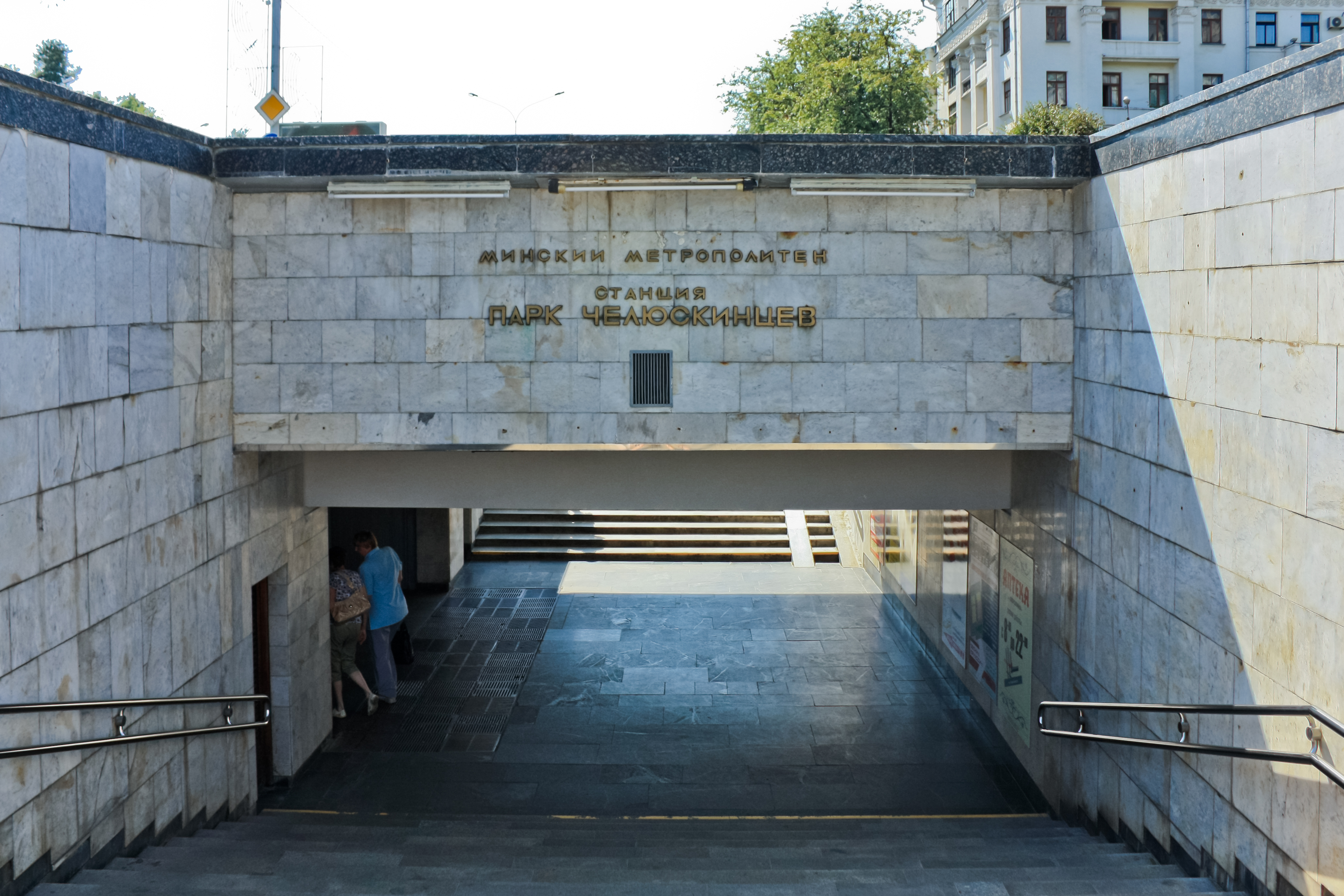
