= Maskoŭskaja (Minsk Metro) =

Minsk Metro station

Maskoŭskaja Маскоўская
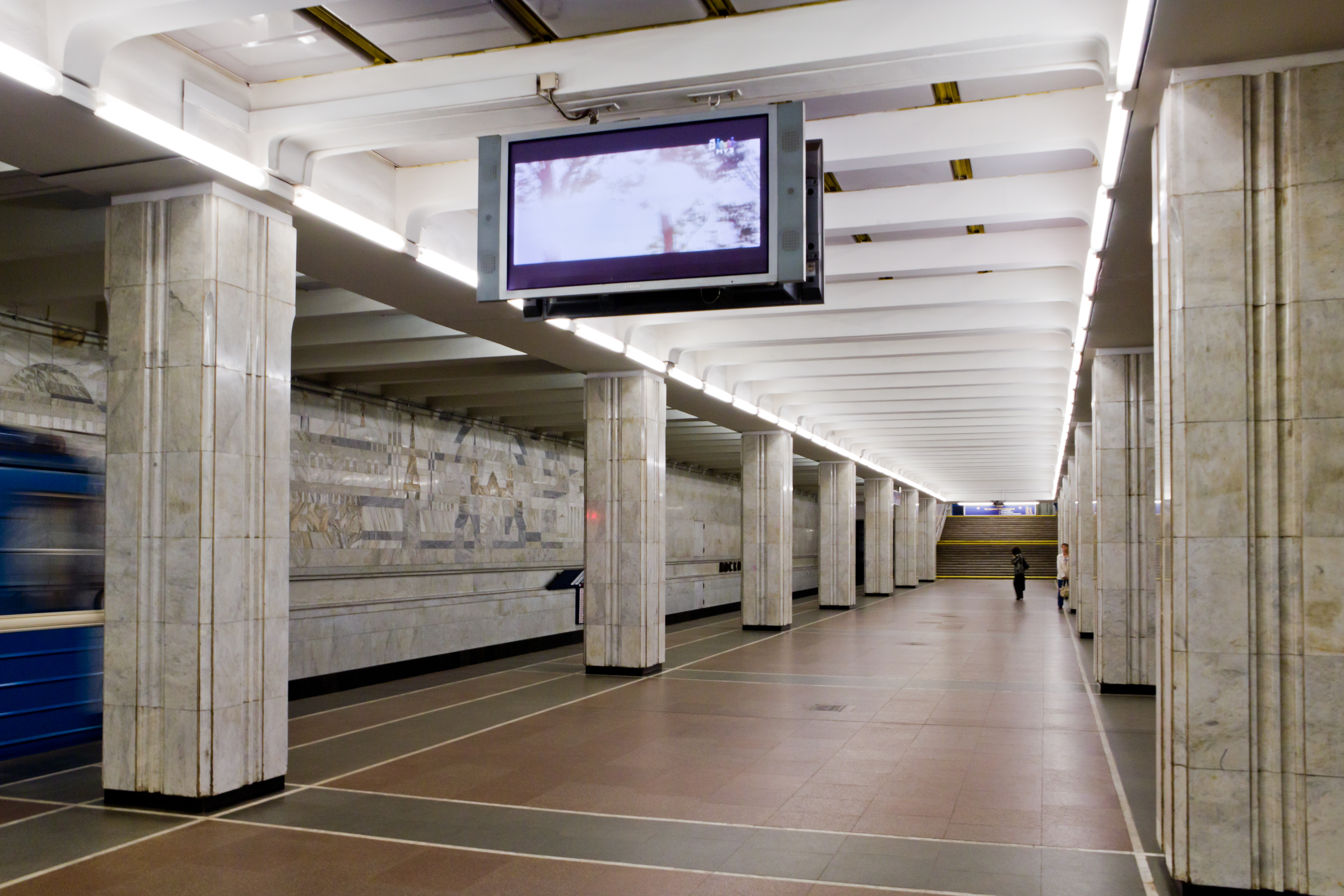
- Station Hall

General information
- Coordinates: 53.9279°N 27.6278°E
- System: Minsk Metro
- Owner: Minsk Metro
- Line: Maskoŭskaja line
- Platforms: Island platform
- Tracks: 2

Construction
- Structure type: Underground

Other information
- Station code: 121

History
- Opened: 26 June 1984; 42 years ago

Services
| Preceding station | Minsk Metro | Following station |
|---|---|---|
| Uschod towards Uručča | Maskoŭskaja line | Park Čaliuskincaŭ towards Malinawka |
Location
- Location within Belarus

Maskoŭskaja (Belarusian: Маскоўская, Russian: Московская; literally: "Moscow station") is a Minsk Metro station, in Minsk, the capital of Belarus. It was opened on 26 June 1984.

The station entrance is near Chelyuskinites Park and close to the Children's Railroad.

== Gallery ==
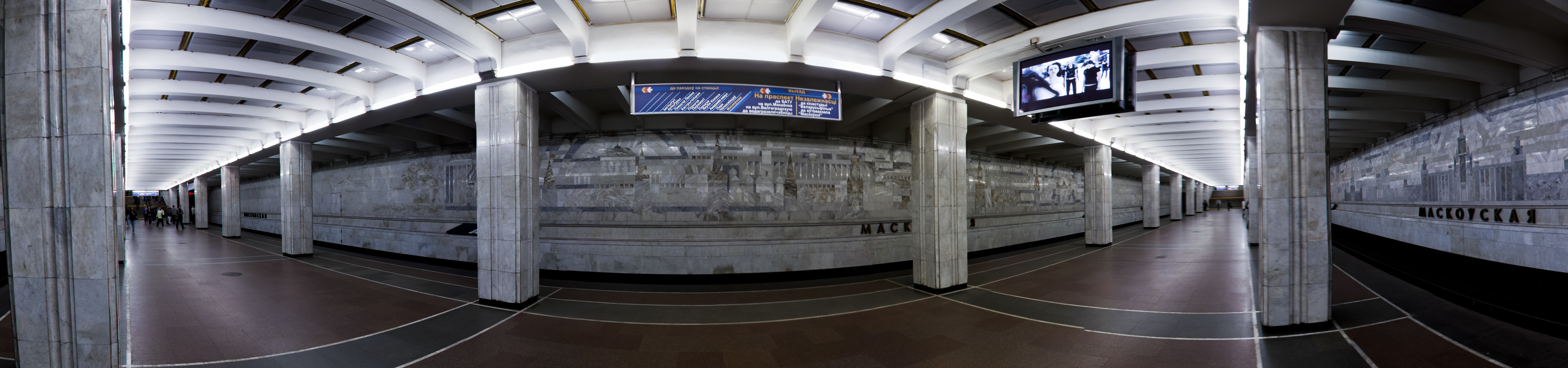

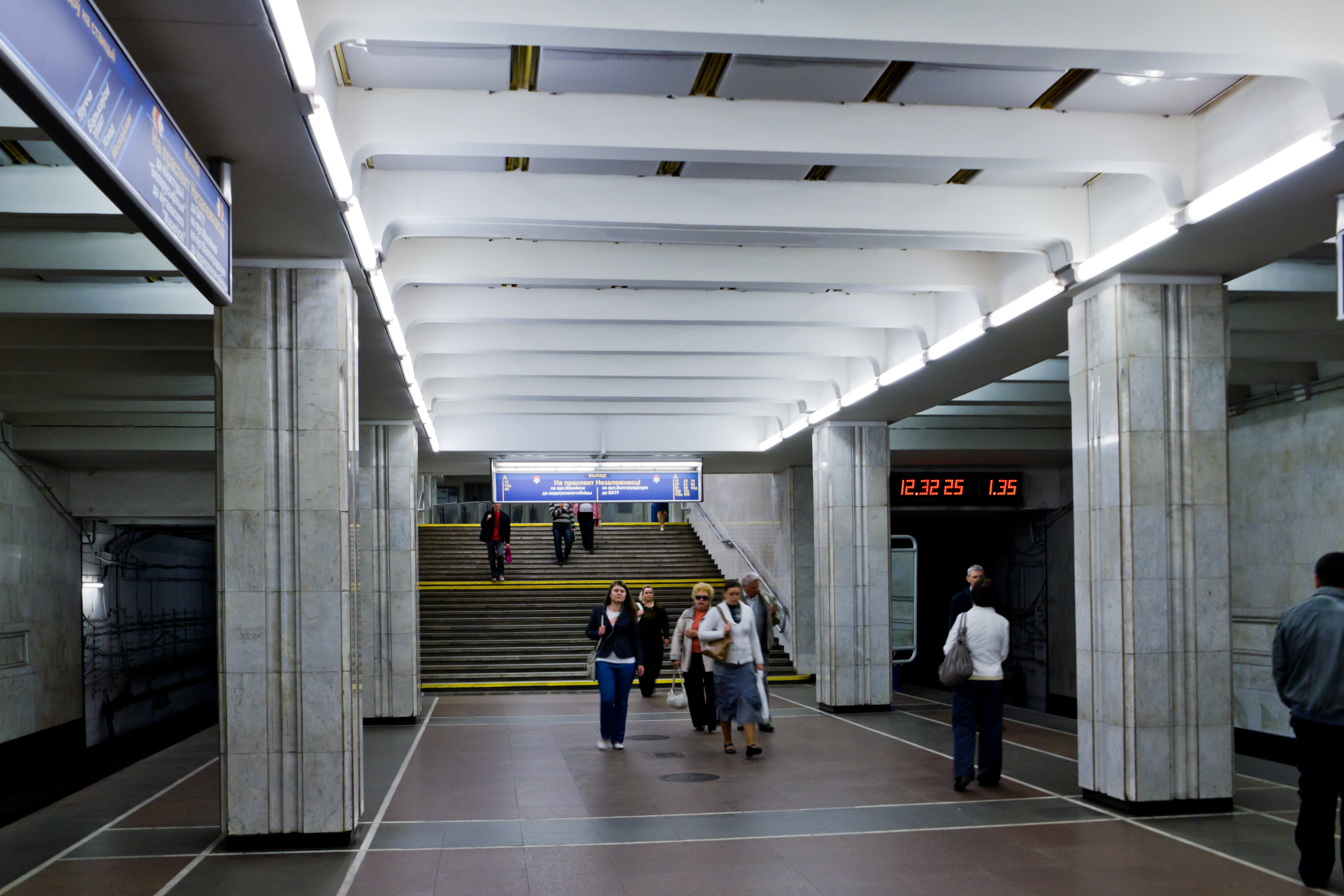

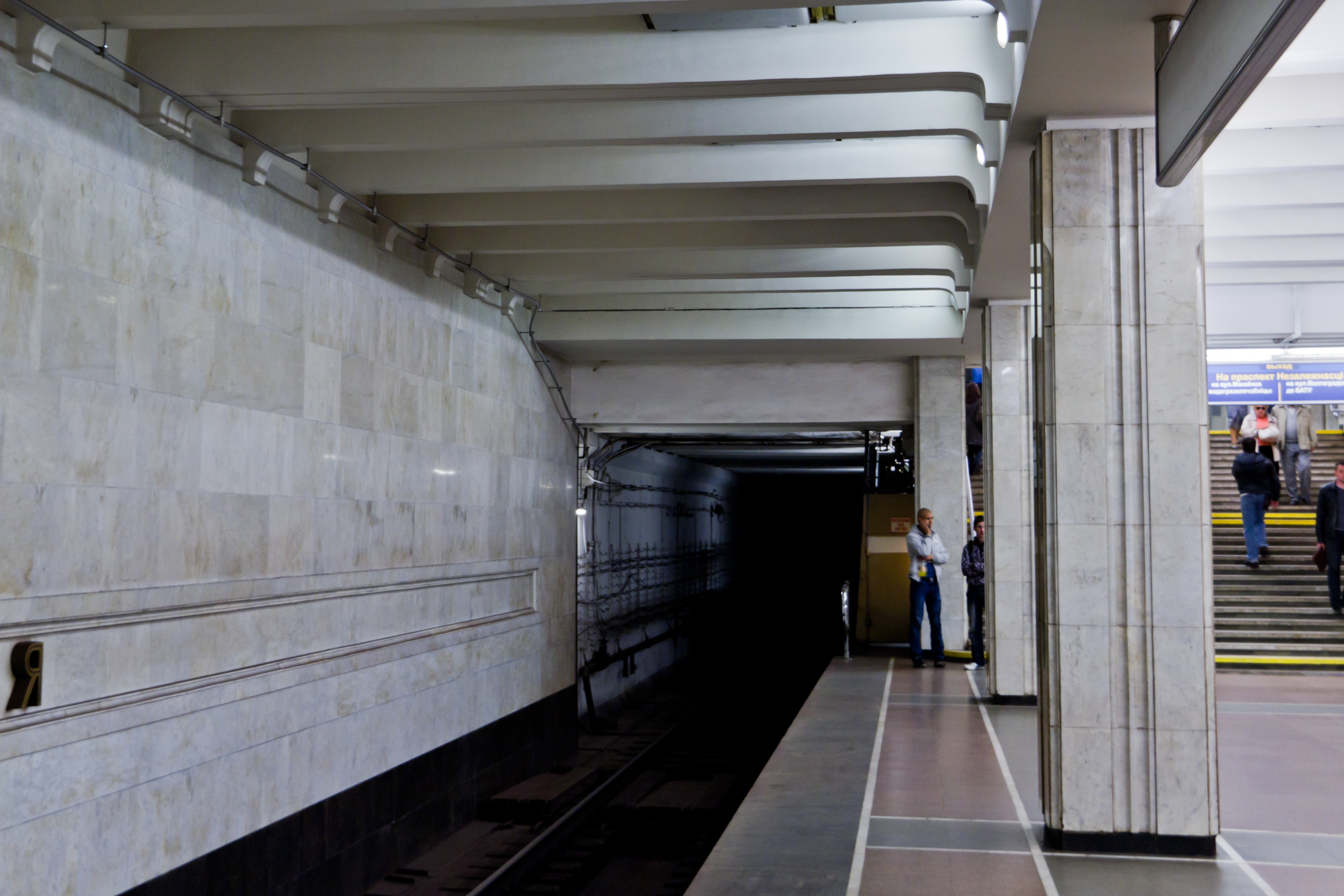

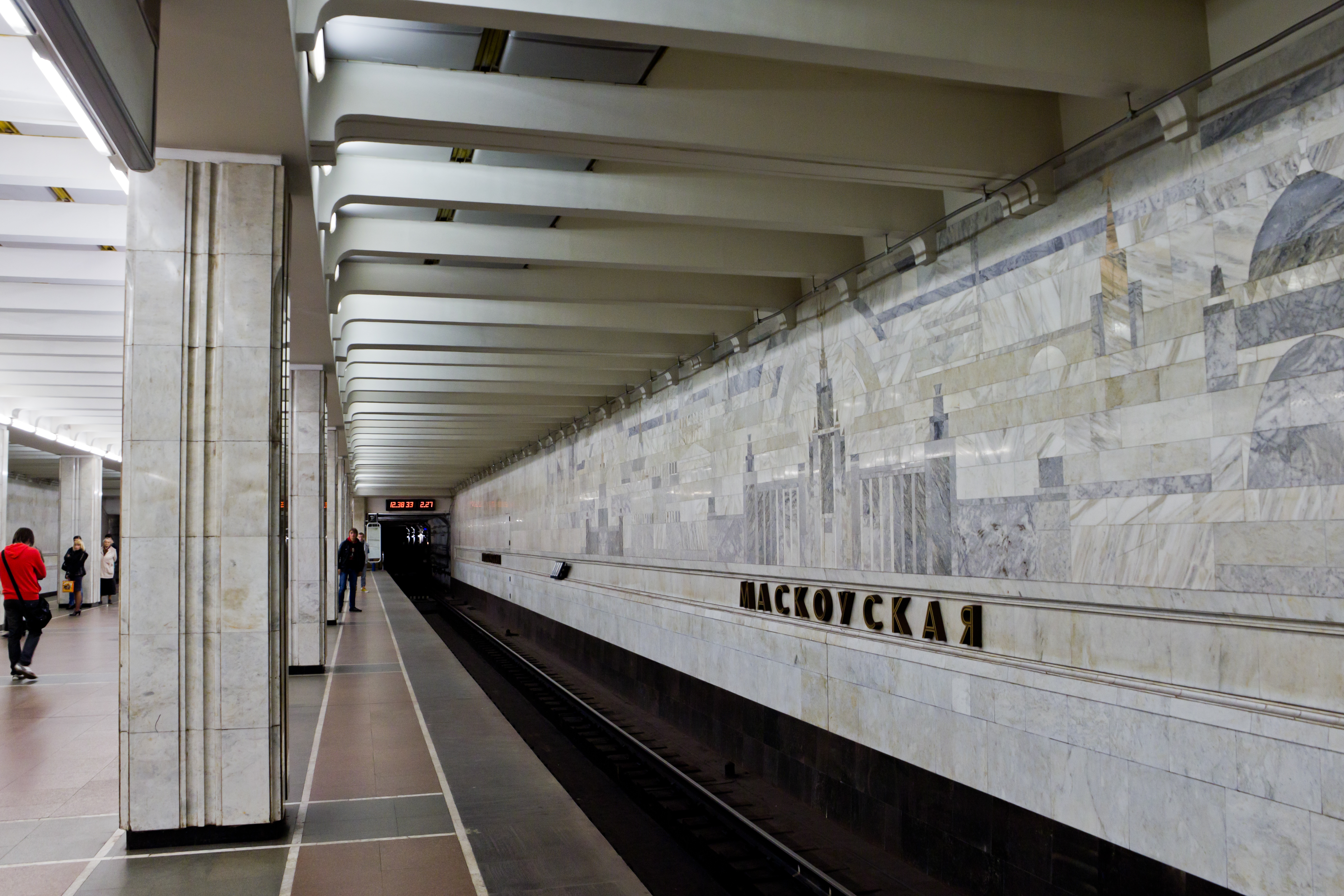

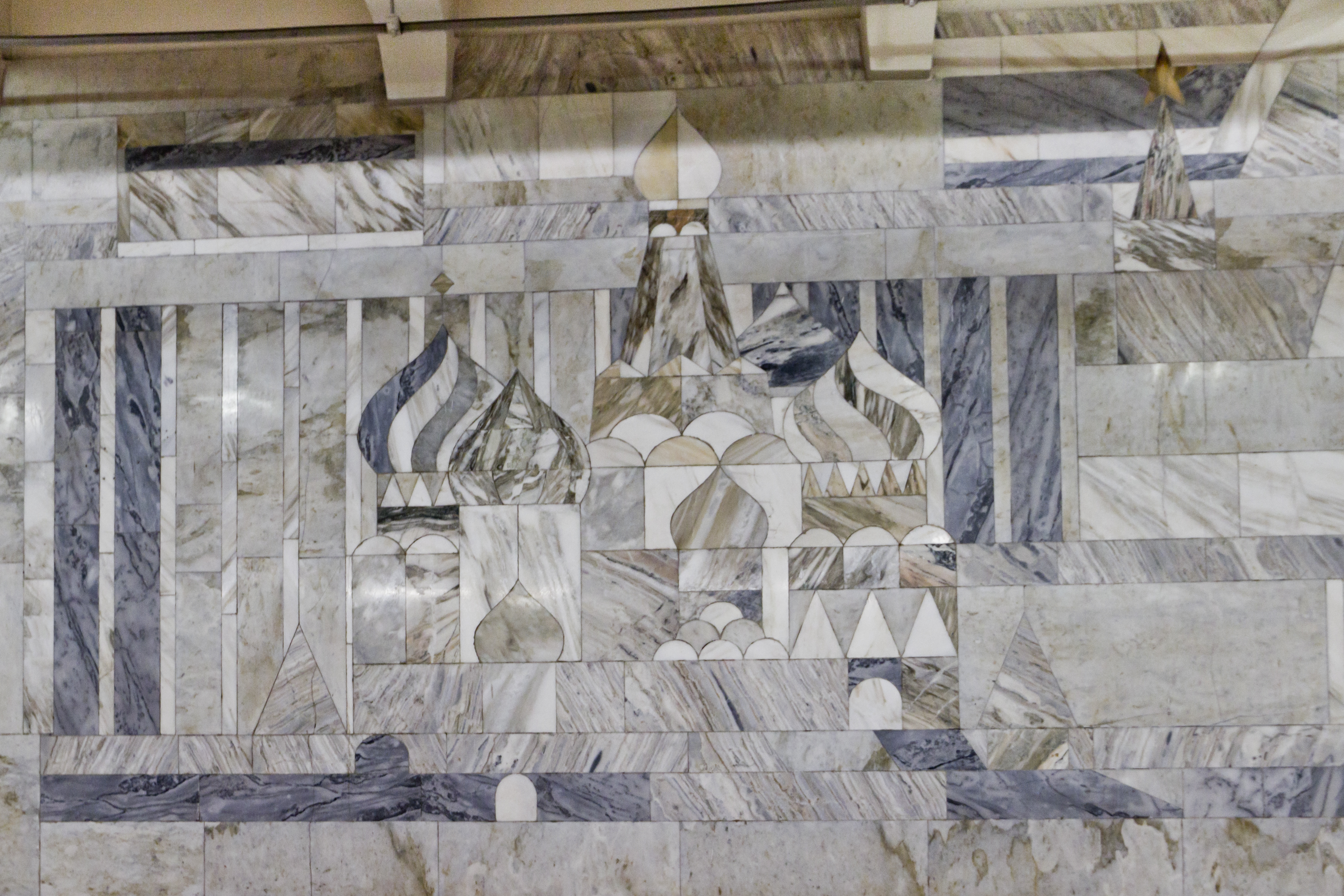

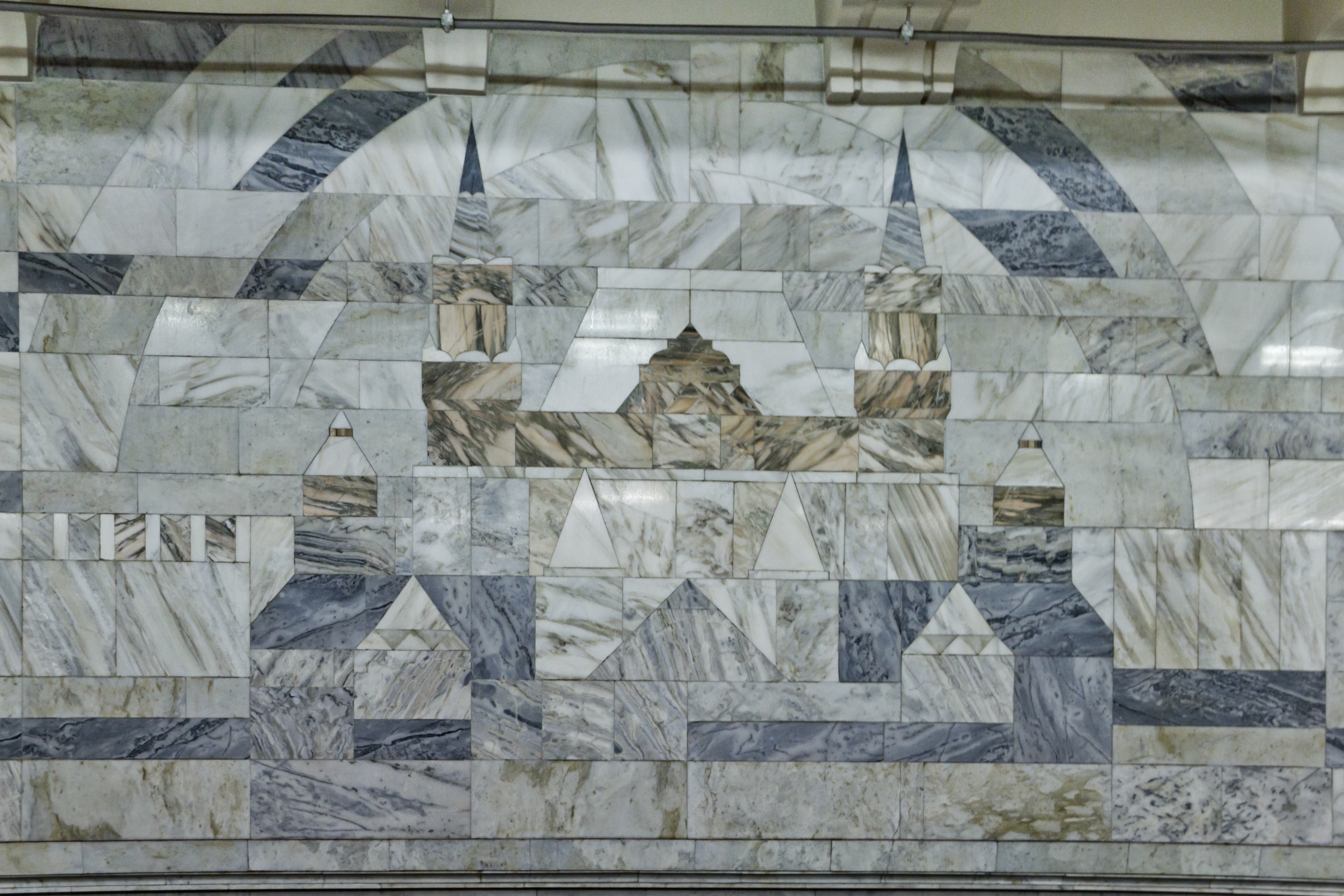
