= Akademiya Navuk (Minsk Metro) =

Minsk Metro station

Akademiya Navuk Акадэмія навук
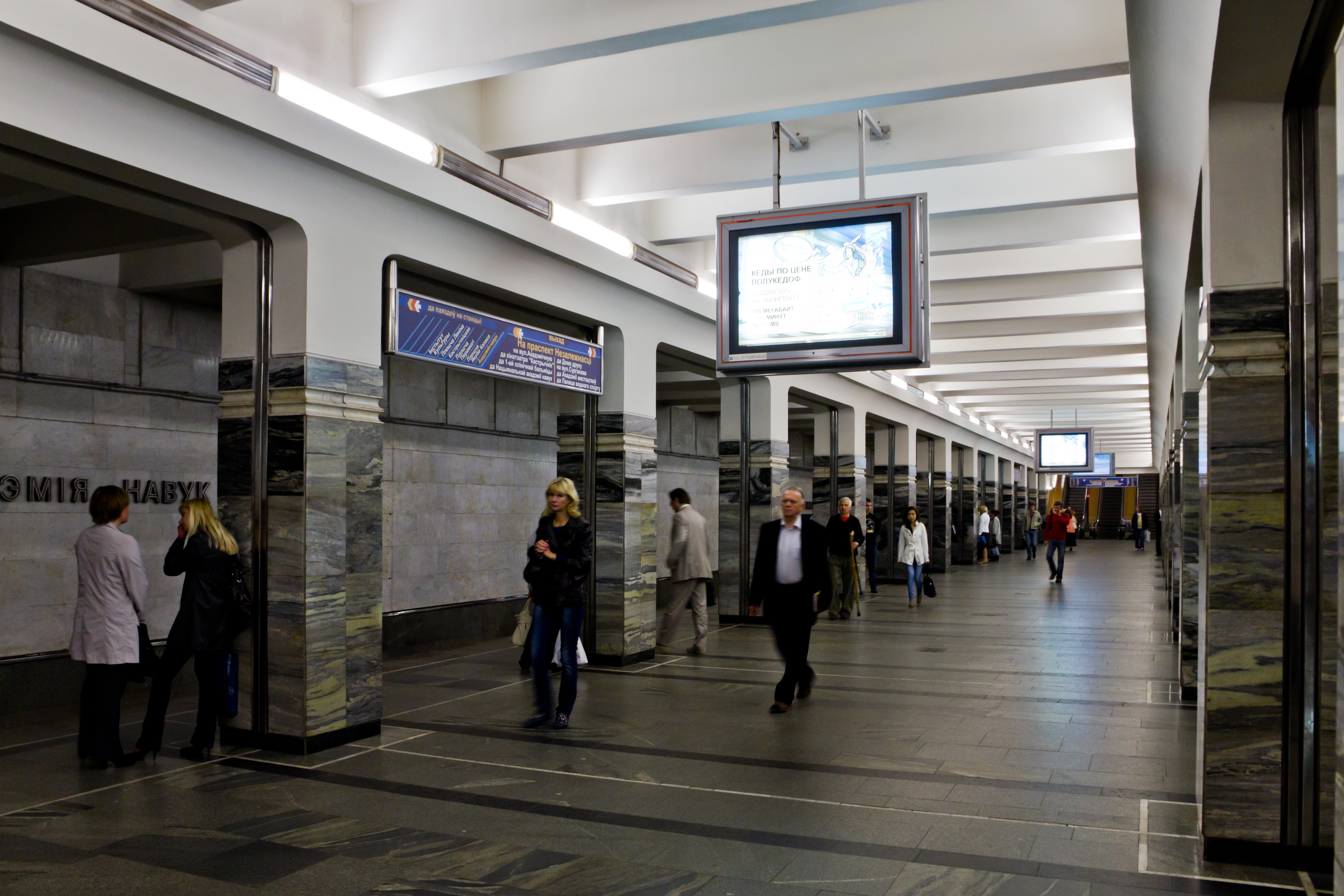
- Akademiya Navuk station platform

General information
- Coordinates: 53°55′18″N 27°35′50″E
- System: Minsk Metro
- Owner: Minsk Metro
- Line: Maskoŭskaja line
- Platforms: Island platform
- Tracks: 2

Construction
- Structure type: Underground

Other information
- Station code: 119

History
- Opened: 30 June 1984; 42 years ago

Services
Preceding station	Minsk Metro	Following station
Park Čaliuskincaŭ towards Uručča	Maskoŭskaja line	Ploshcha Yakuba Kolasa towards Malinawka
Location
- Location within Belarus

Akademiya Navuk (Belarusian: Акадэмія навук, pronounced [akaˈdɛmʲija naˈvuk]; Russian: Академия Наук; lit. Academy of Sciences) is a station on the Minsk Metro's Maskoŭskaja line. Named after the National Academy of Sciences of Belarus, which is located nearby, the station was opened along the first stage of the metro on 30 June 1984.

Designed by architects A.Zenzin and M.Pirogov, the station is a typical pillar-trispan consisting of two rows of concrete pillars, which are revetted with grey marble, and punctuated by stainless steel insets. In addition the station features contrasting white marbled walls and grey granite floor. Both vestibules have large artworks (work of V.Churilo and S.Sokolov).

The station has two underground vestibules, the western one is located on the intersection of the Independence avenue with the Surganov street, and is linked to the stations by escalators. The eastern one also offers access to the "Oktyabr" cinema and the Academy itself.

In the future it is possible that this station will be a transfer point to the fourth line.
