= Children's Railroad (Minsk) =

Railway loop in Minsk, Belarus

Coordinates: 53.925994°N 27.621732°E

Children's Railroad of Minsk
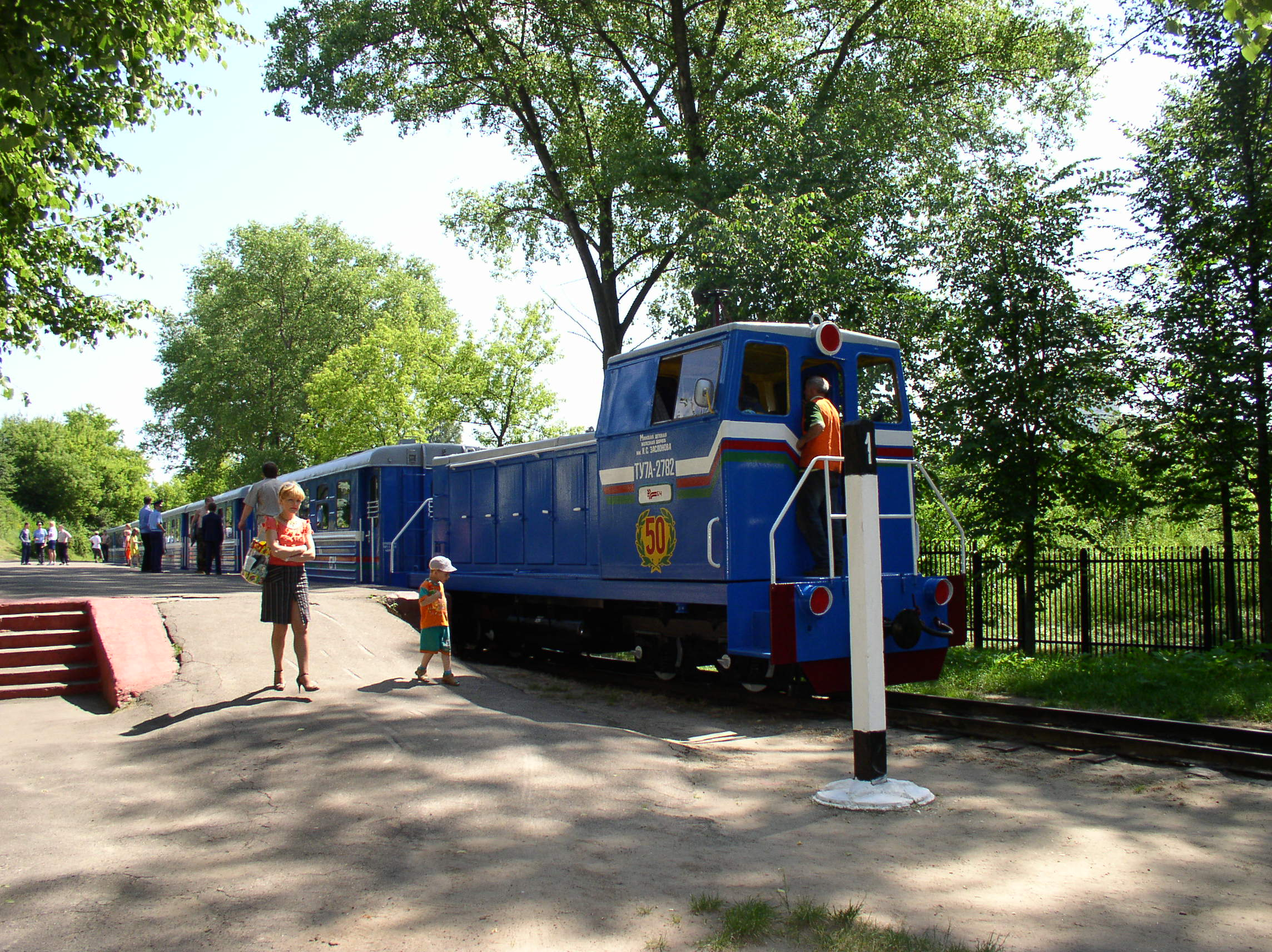
- A TU7 diesel locomotive in Zaslonovo

Technical
- Line length: 3.79 km
- Track gauge: 750 mm (2 ft 5 1/2 in)

K. S. Zaslonov Children's Railroad in Minsk (Belarusian: Дзiцячая чыгунка, Dzitsyachaya chyhunka; Russian: Минская детская железная дорога имени К.С.Заслонова, Minskaya detskaya zheleznaya doroga imeni K.S.Zaslonova) is a 750 mm (2 ft 5 1/2 in) narrow gauge railroad loop passing through the Chelyuskinites Park in Minsk, Belarus.

== Overview ==
It is fully operated by teenagers. One of many children's railways that existed in the USSR and continued functioning after its breakup in post-Soviet states, it was opened on July 9, 1955. There was a 4-year program to train future railway personnel. In 1971, the railway was named after railman Konstantin Zaslonov, a Hero of the Soviet Union who had commanded a partisan brigade.

The railway line counts 3 stations (listed from north to south): Zaslonovo, Pionerskaya (or Pionerskaja) and Sosnovy Bor (or Sosnovyj Bor); and a pair of rail loops after the end stops. Zaslonovo is located between the Metro stations Park Čaliuskincaŭ and Maskoŭskaja, both on the Maskoŭskaja line.

== Gallery ==
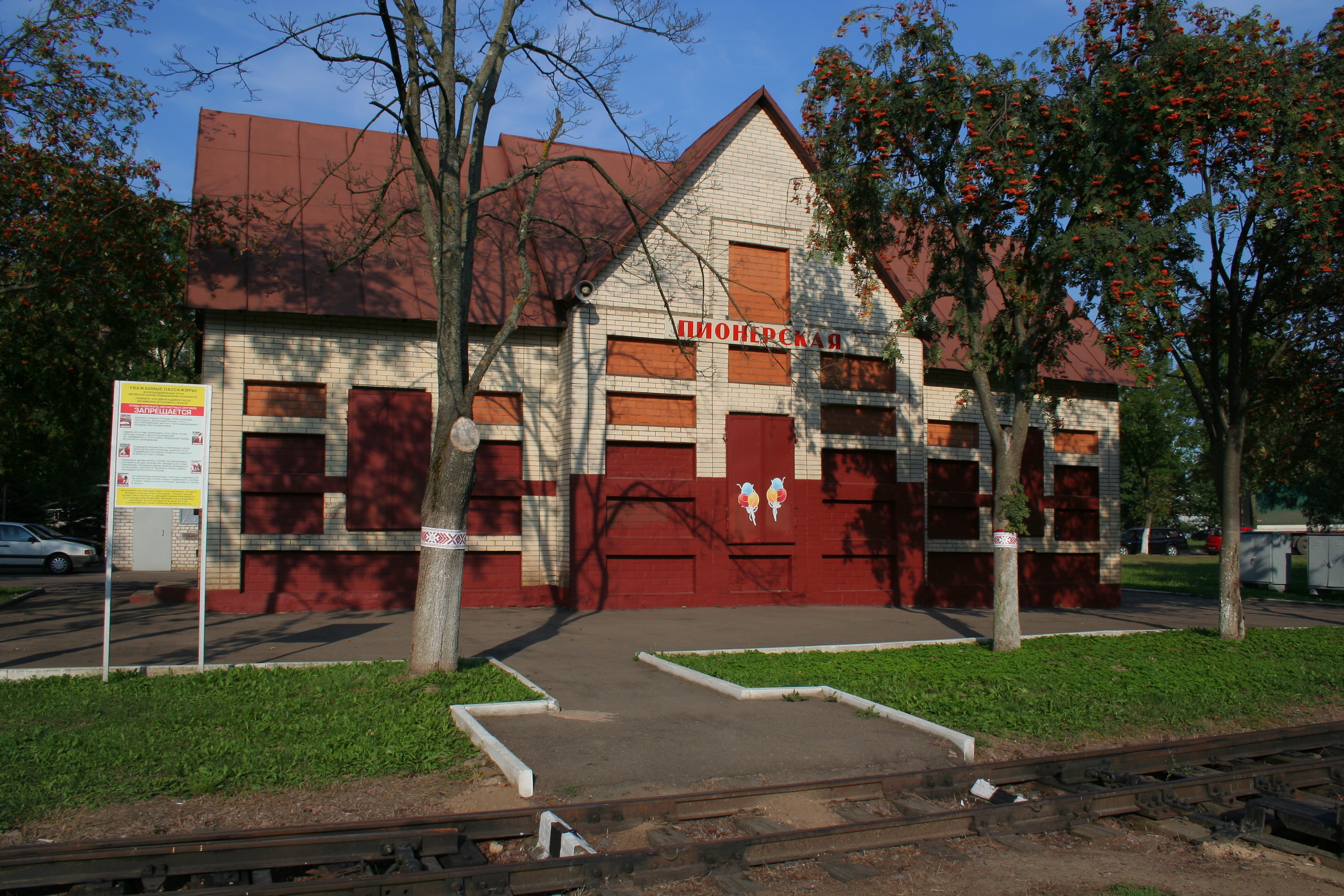
Pionerskaya station

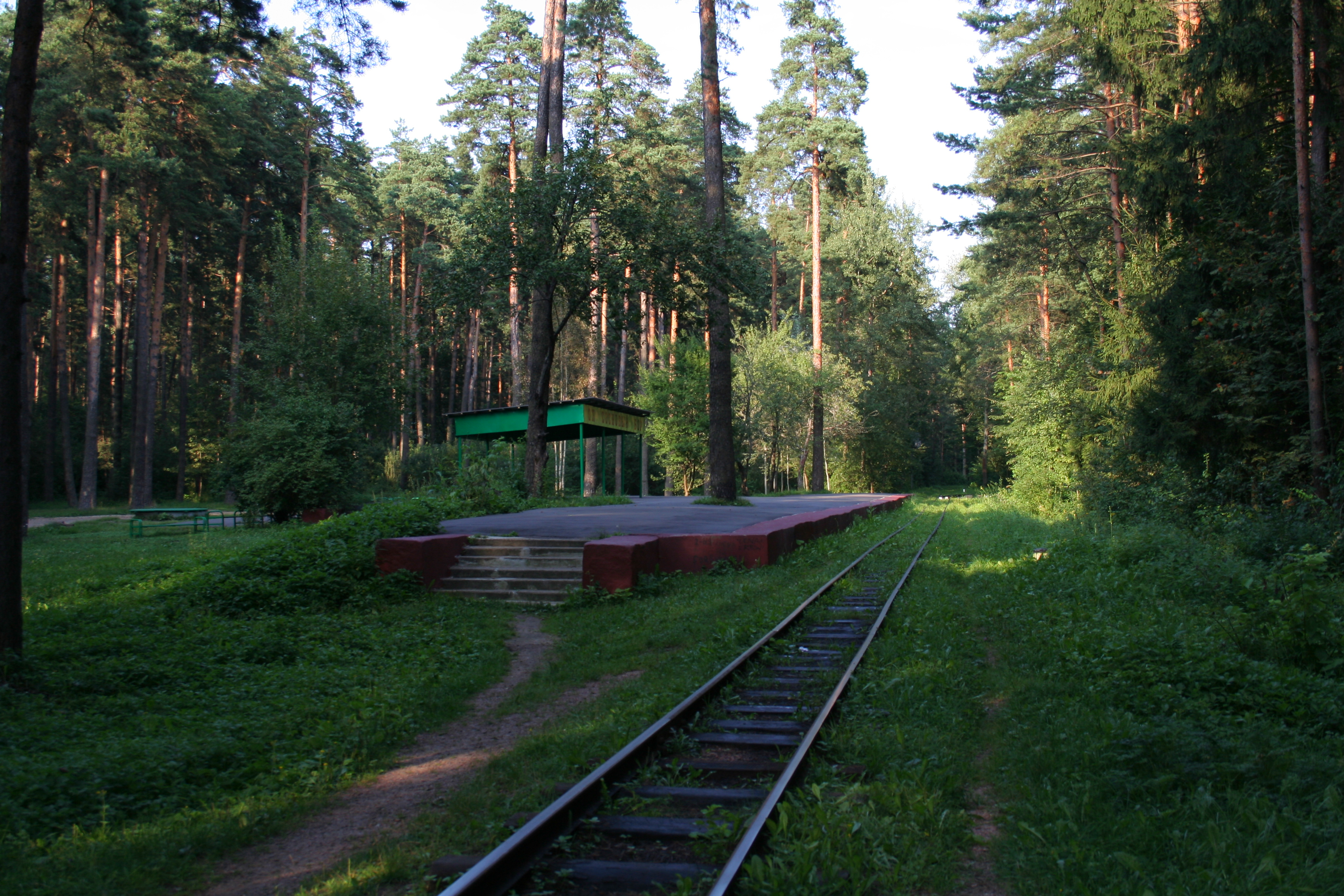
Sosnovy Bor station

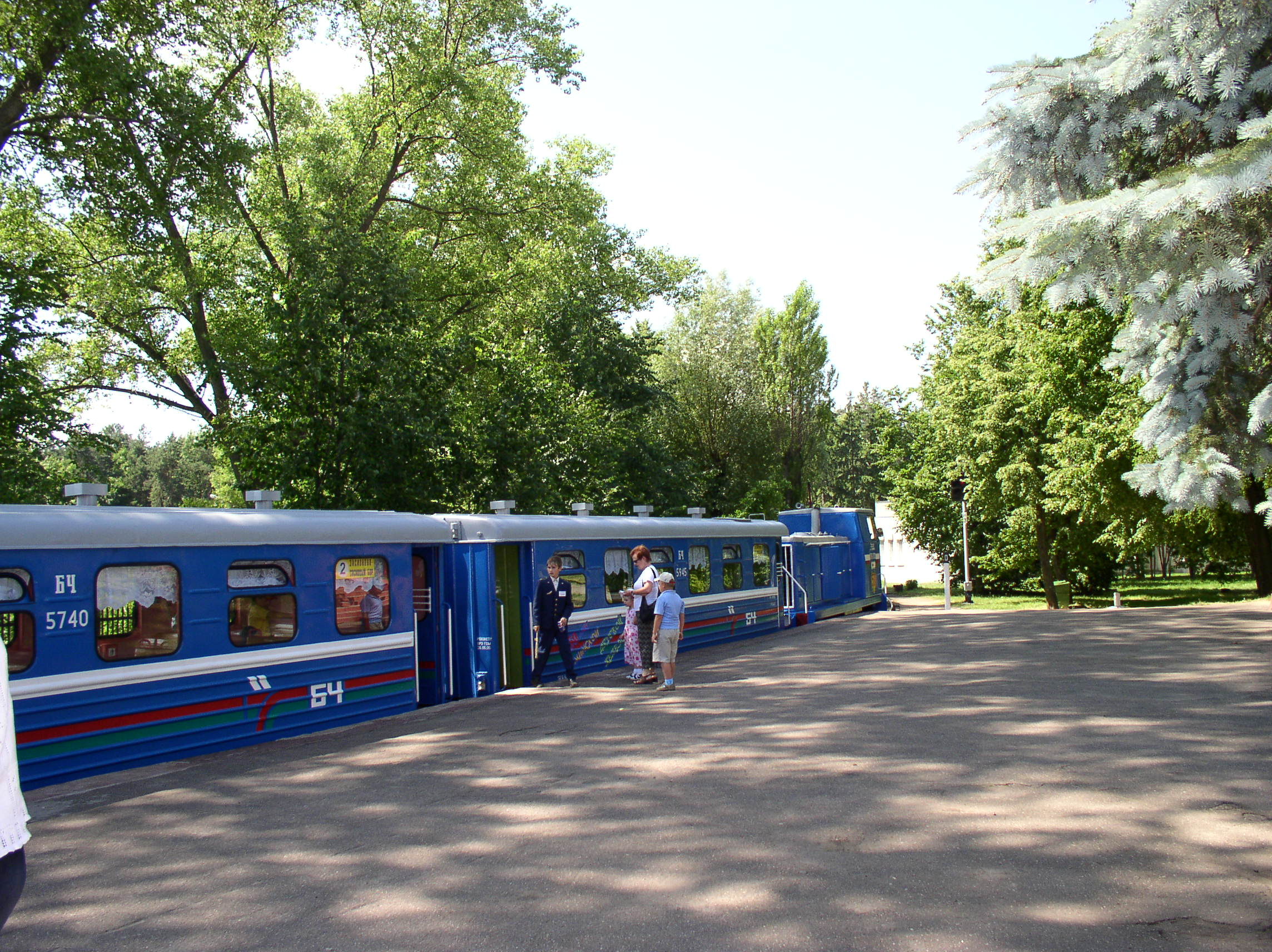
A train in Zaslonovo

== See also ==
- Rail transport in Belarus
- Belaruskaja Čyhunka
- Minsk Passazhirsky railway station
