= Ploshcha Yakuba Kolasa (Minsk Metro) =

Minsk Metro station

Ploshcha Yakuba Kolasa Плошча Якуба Коласа
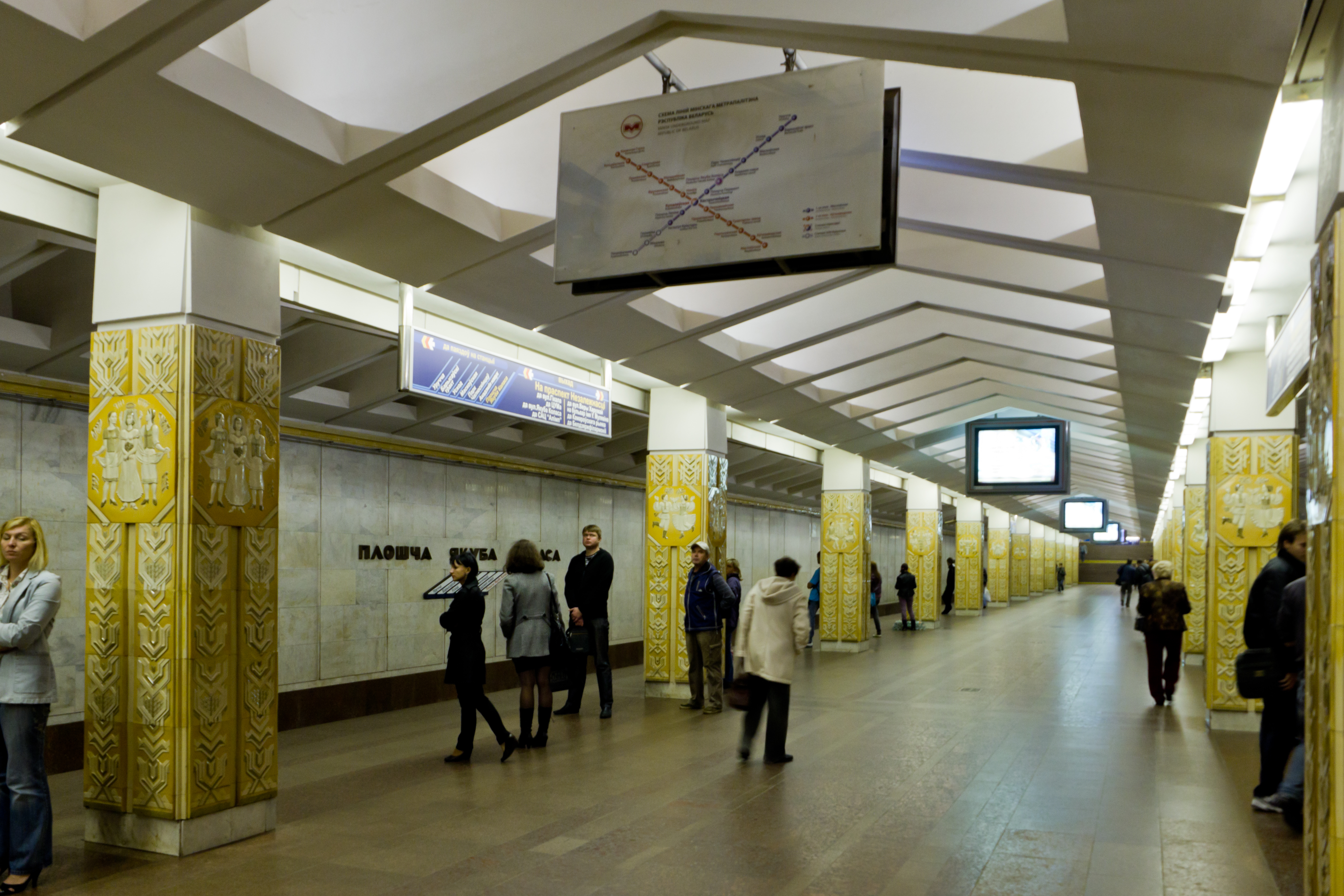
- Station Hall

General information
- Coordinates: 53.9159°N 27.5843°E
- System: Minsk Metro
- Owner: Minsk Metro
- Line: Maskoŭskaja line
- Platforms: 1 island platform
- Tracks: 2

Construction
- Structure type: Underground

Other information
- Station code: 118

History
- Opened: 24 June 1984; 42 years ago

Services
Preceding station	Minsk Metro	Following station
Akademiya Navuk towards Uručča	Maskoŭskaja line	Ploshcha Pyeramohi towards Malinawka
Location
- Location within Belarus

Ploshcha Yakuba Kolasa (Belarusian: Плошча Якуба Коласа; Russian: Площадь Якуба Коласа) is a Minsk Metro station. It was opened on June 24, 1984.

Station was named after Belarusian writer Yakub Kolas, and literally means Square of Yakub Kolas.

== Gallery ==
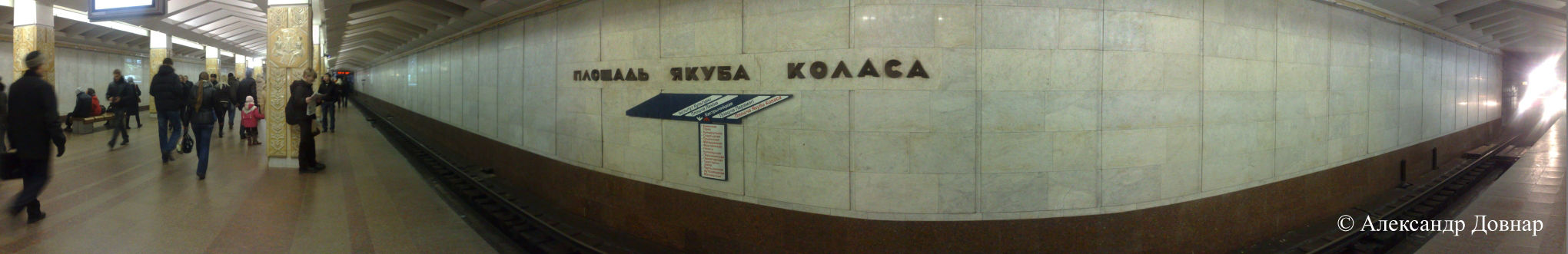

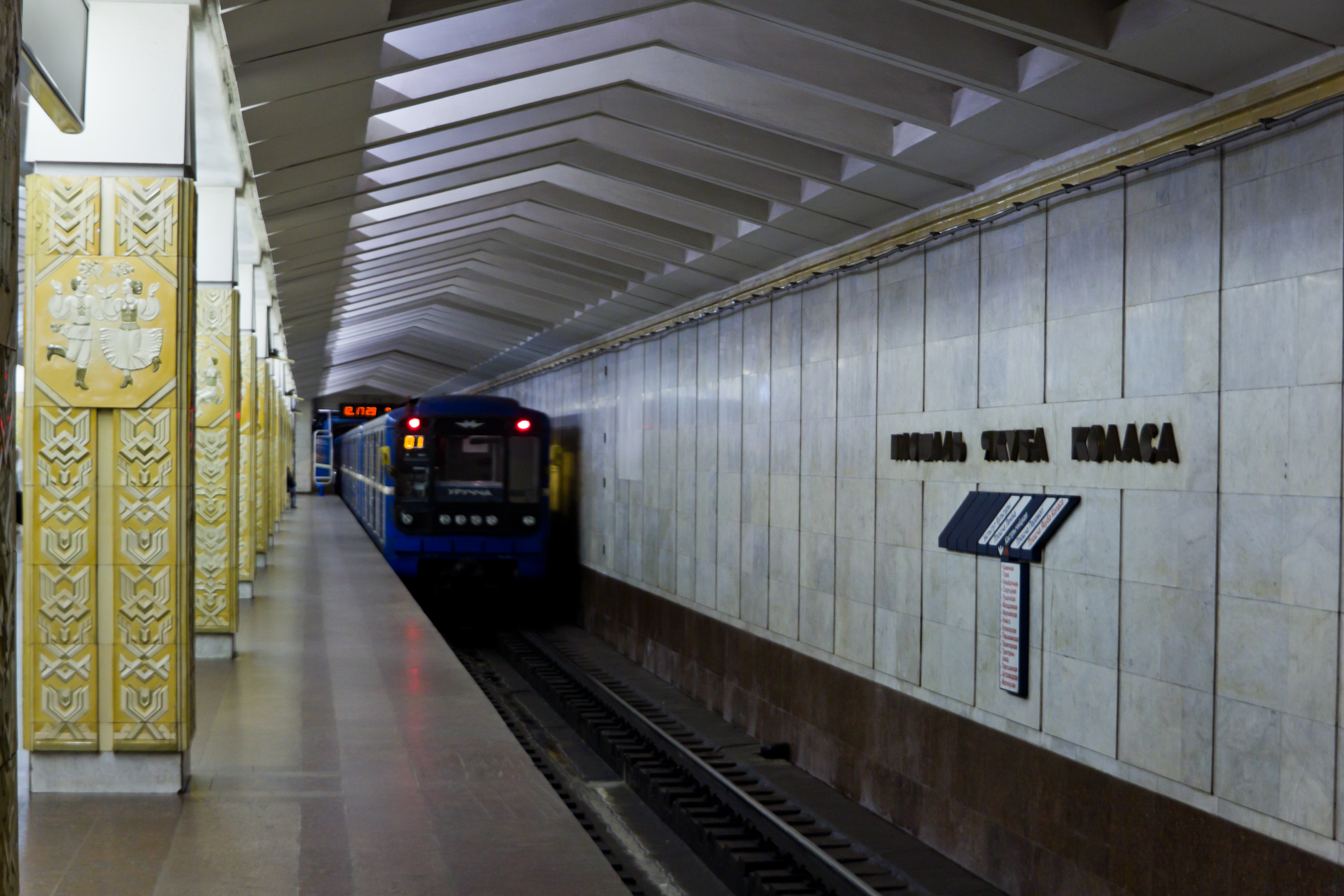

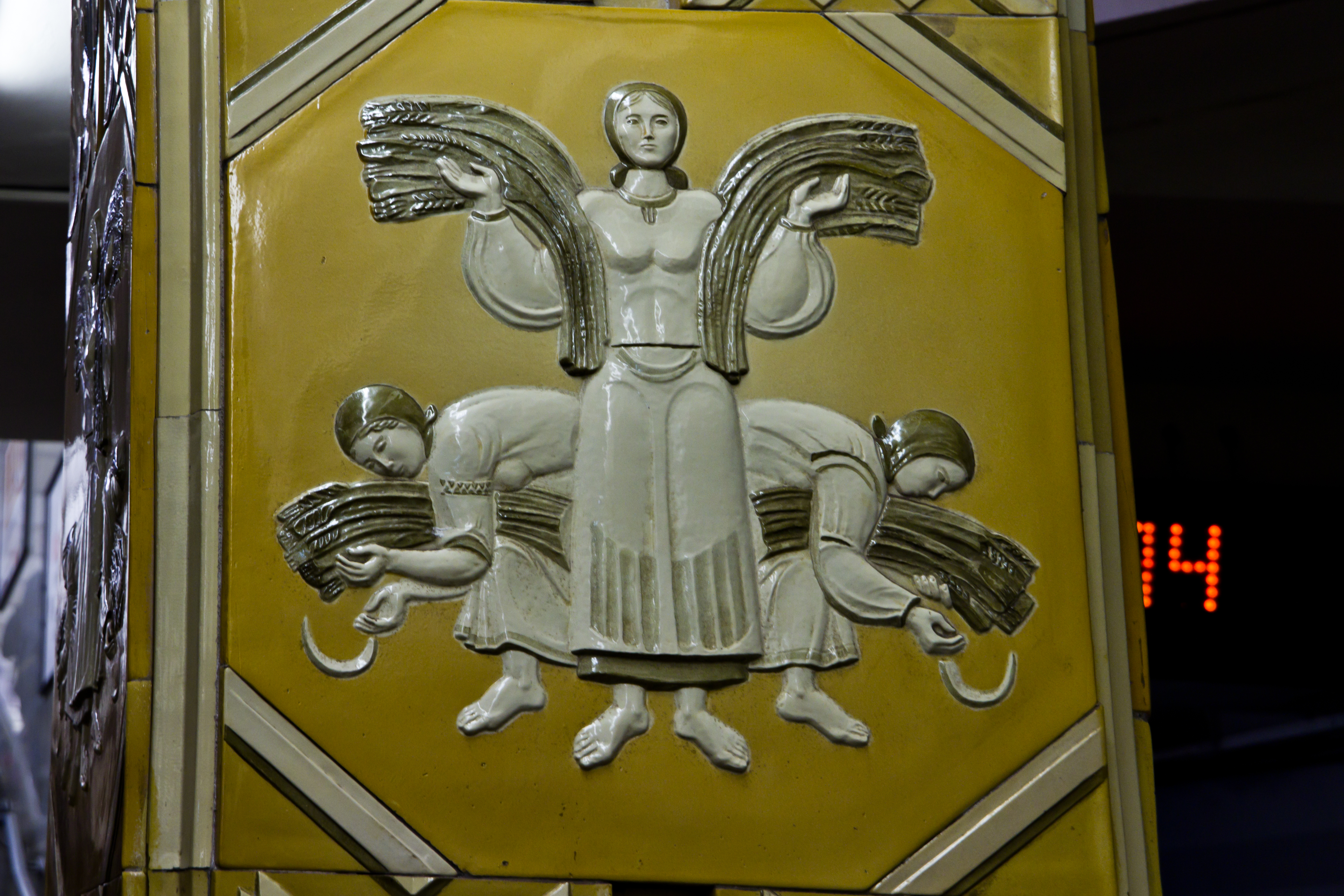

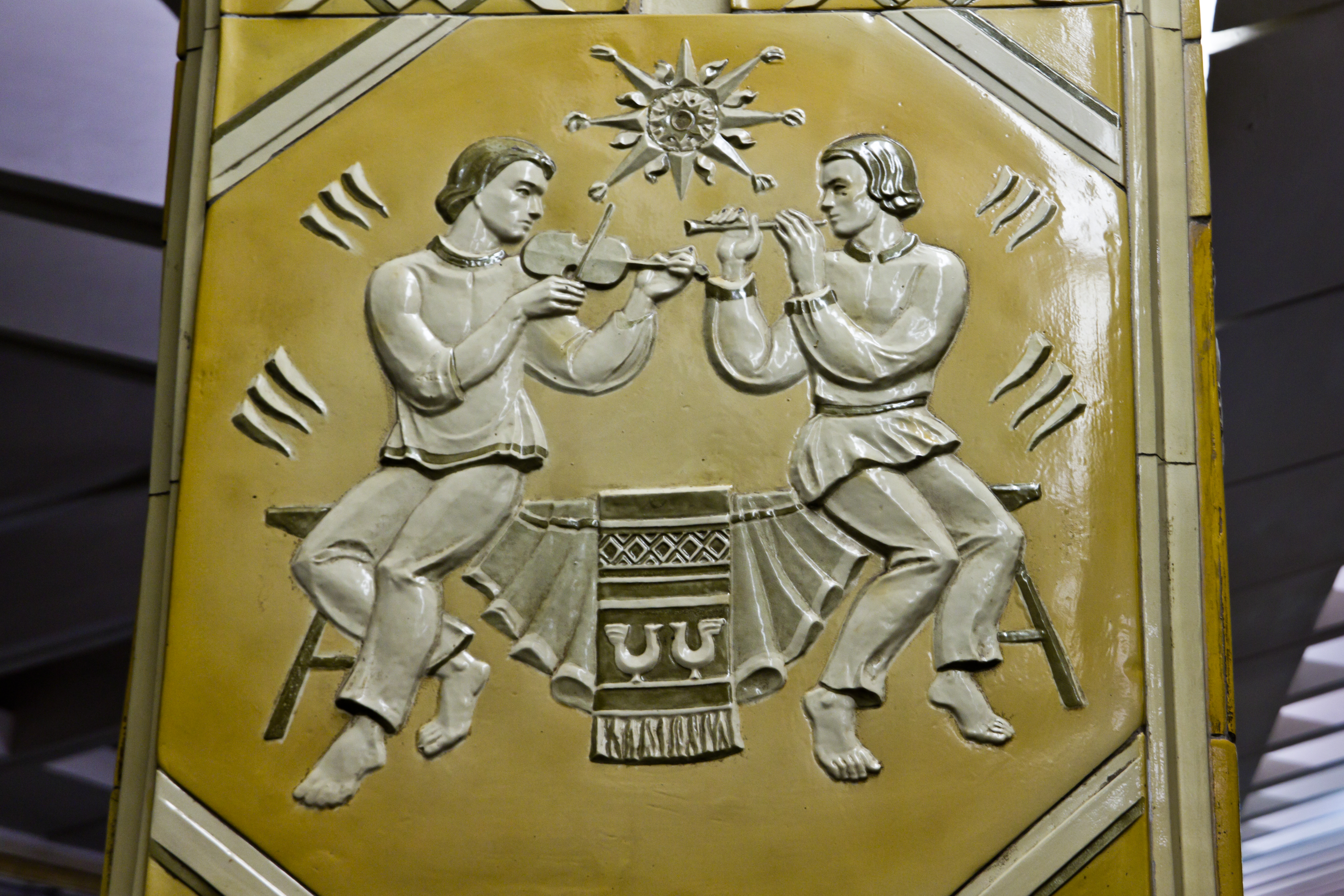

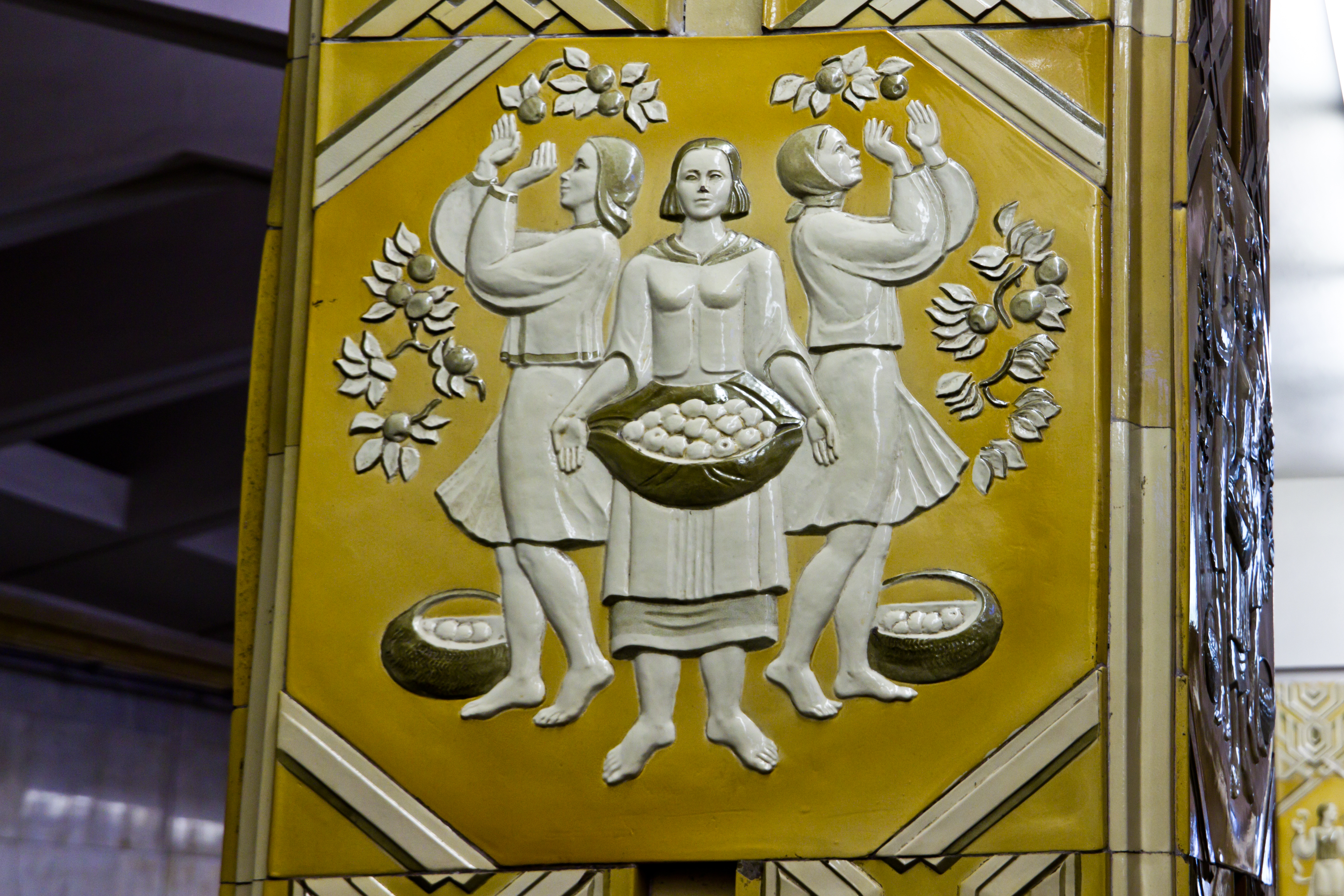

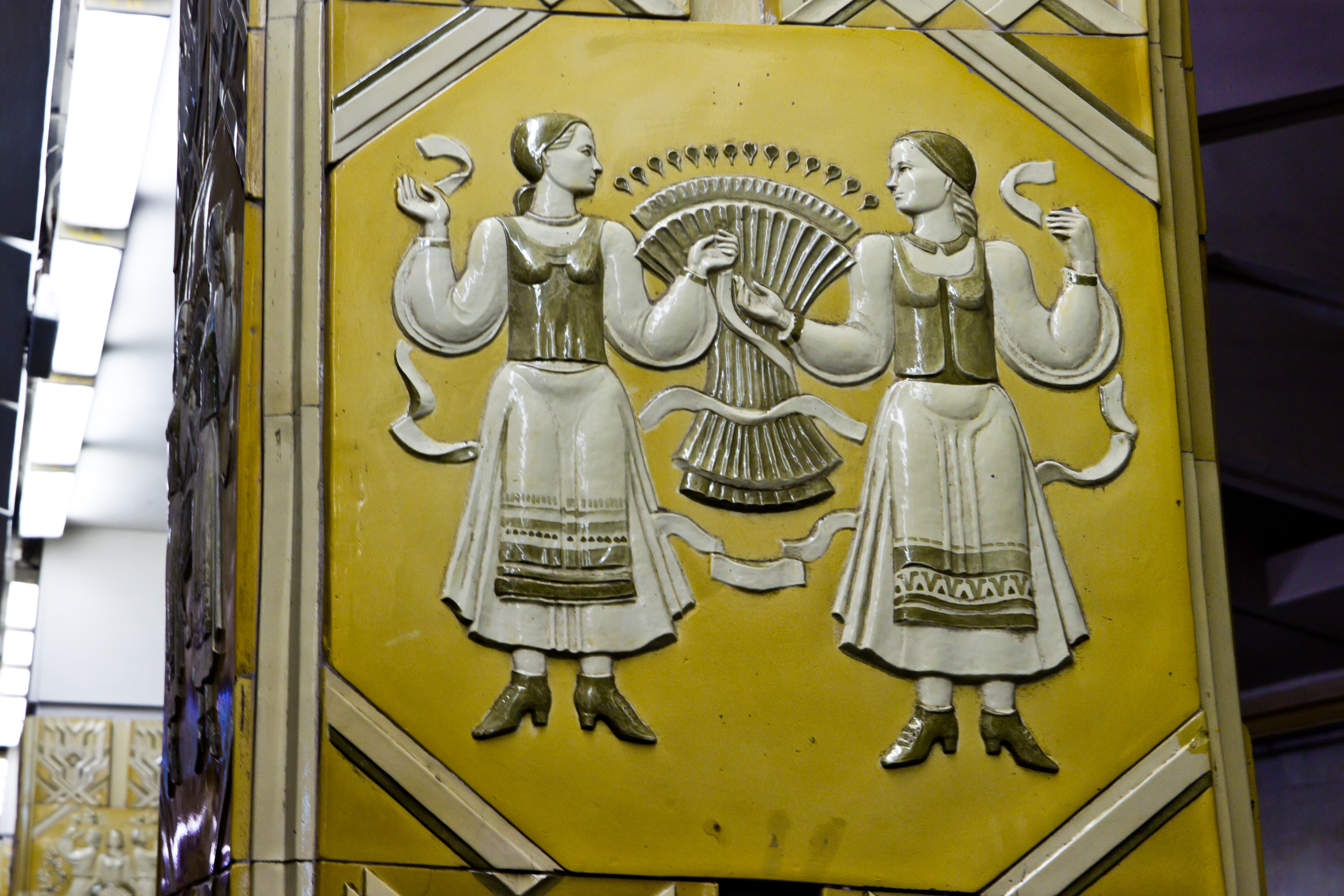

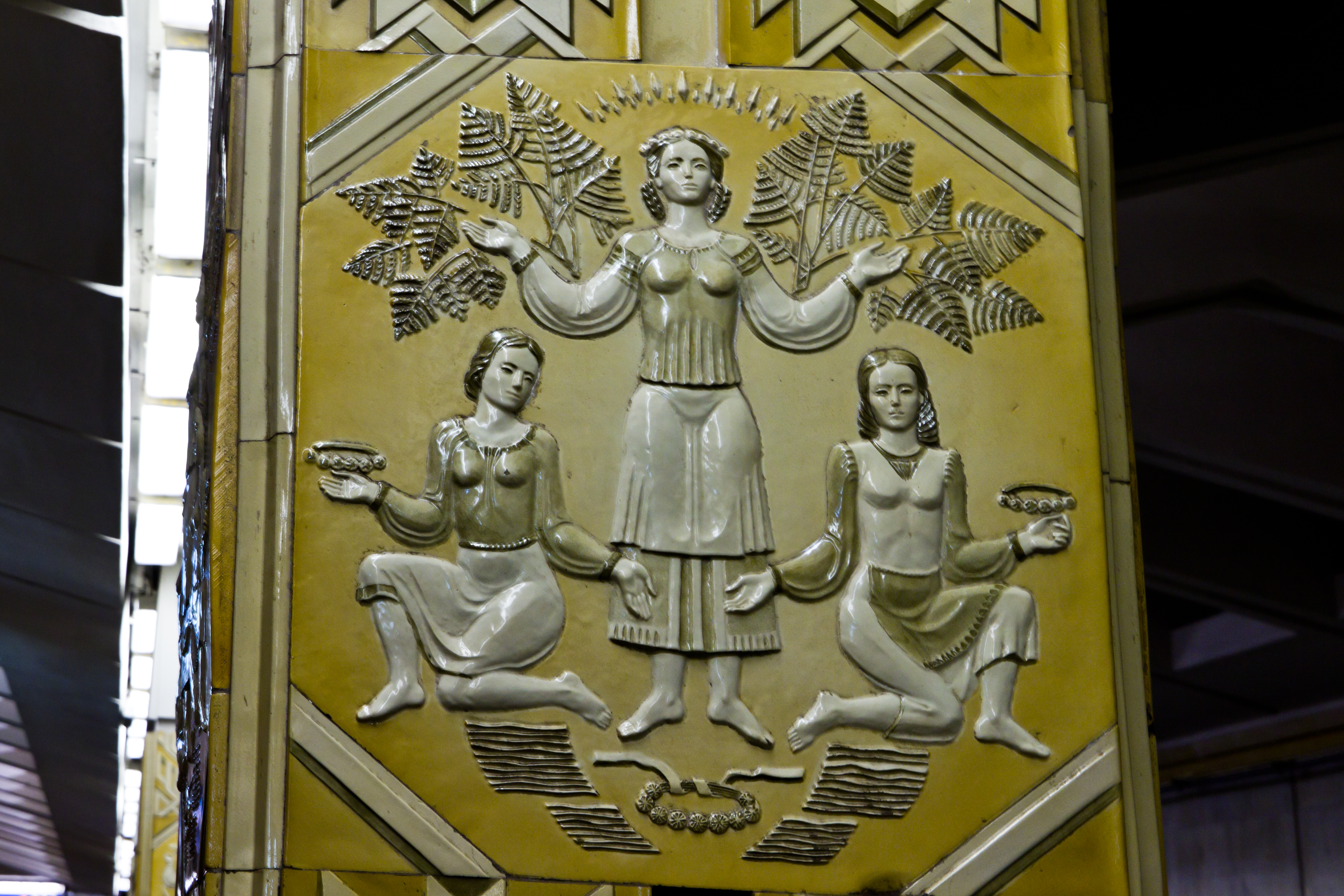

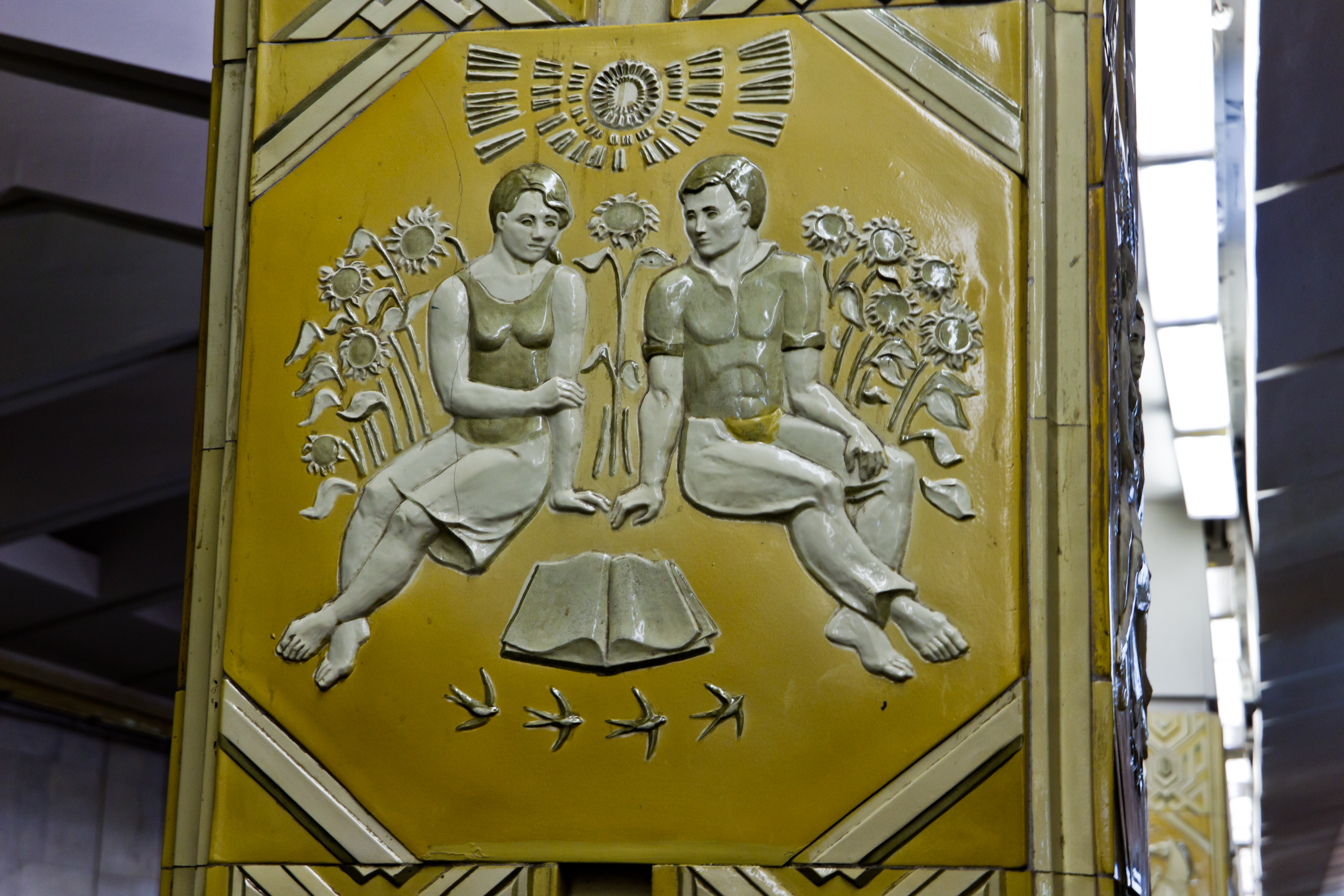

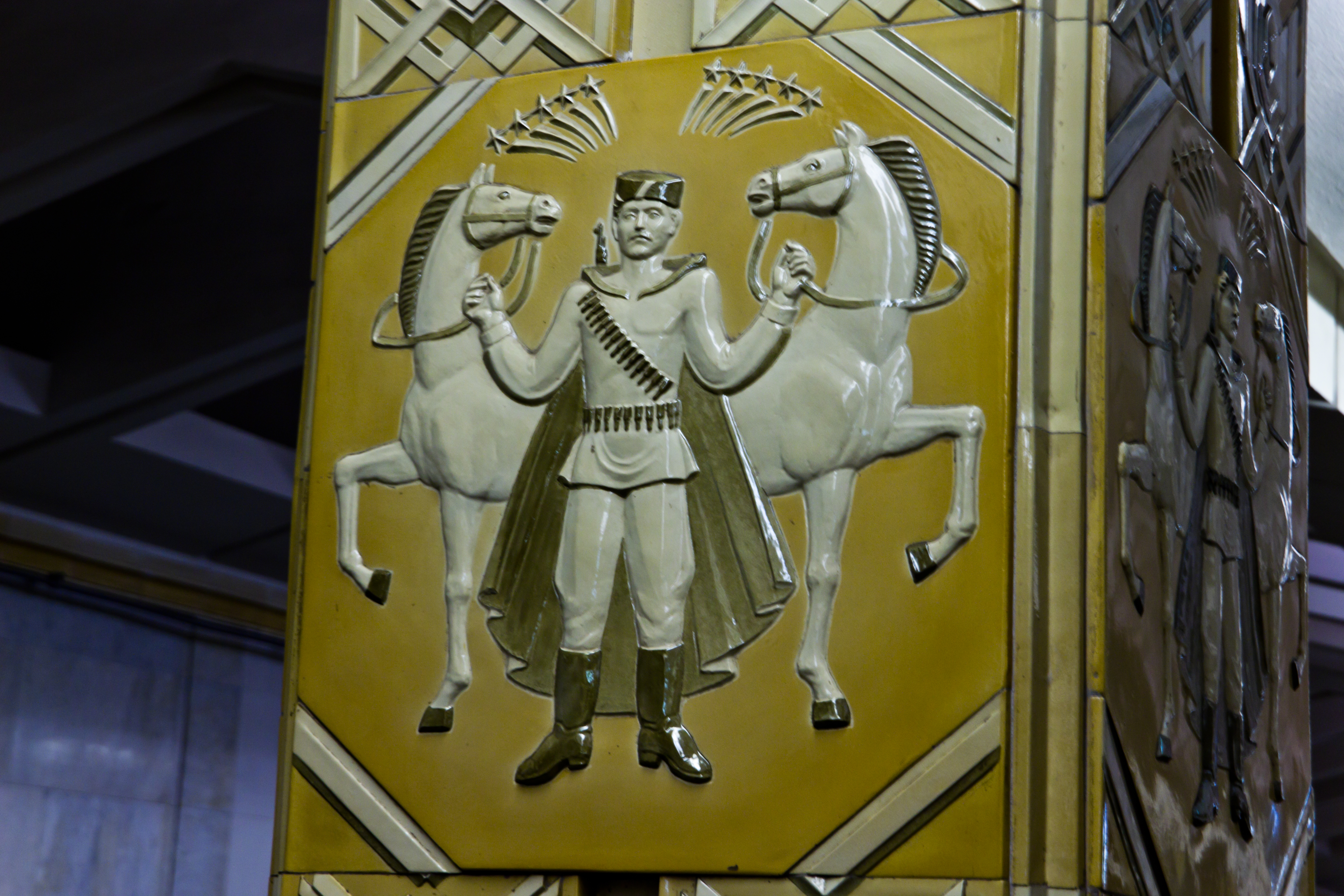

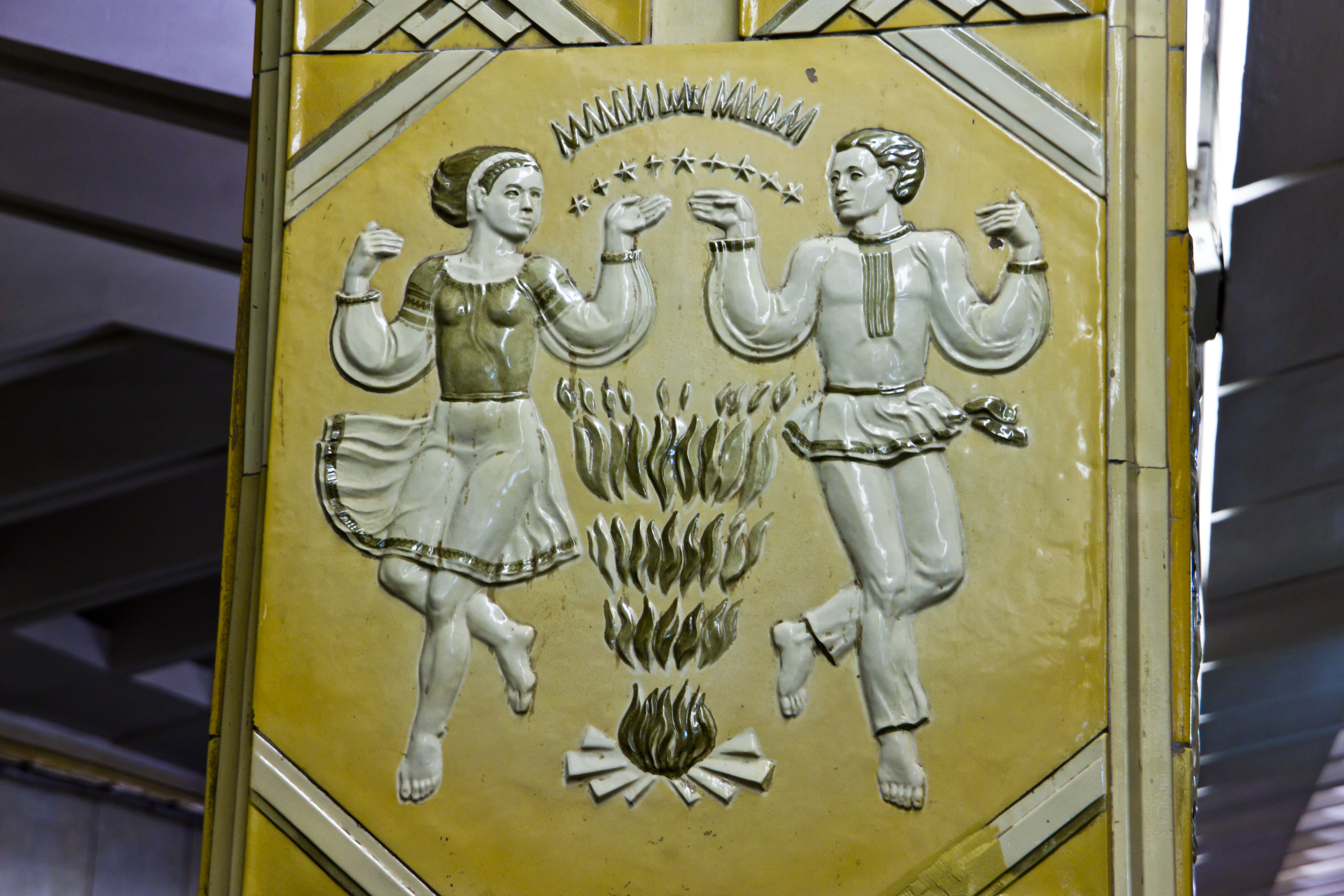

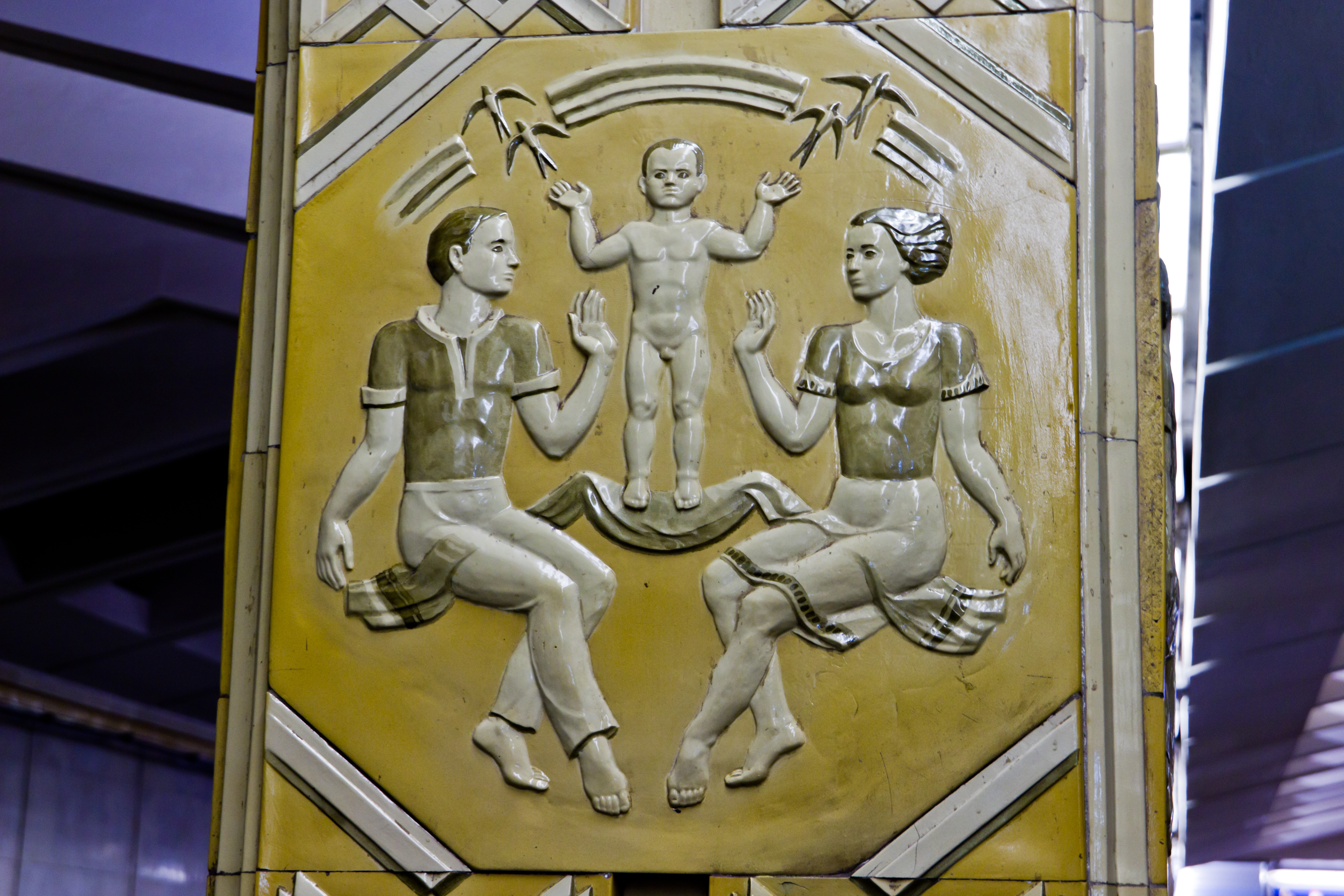

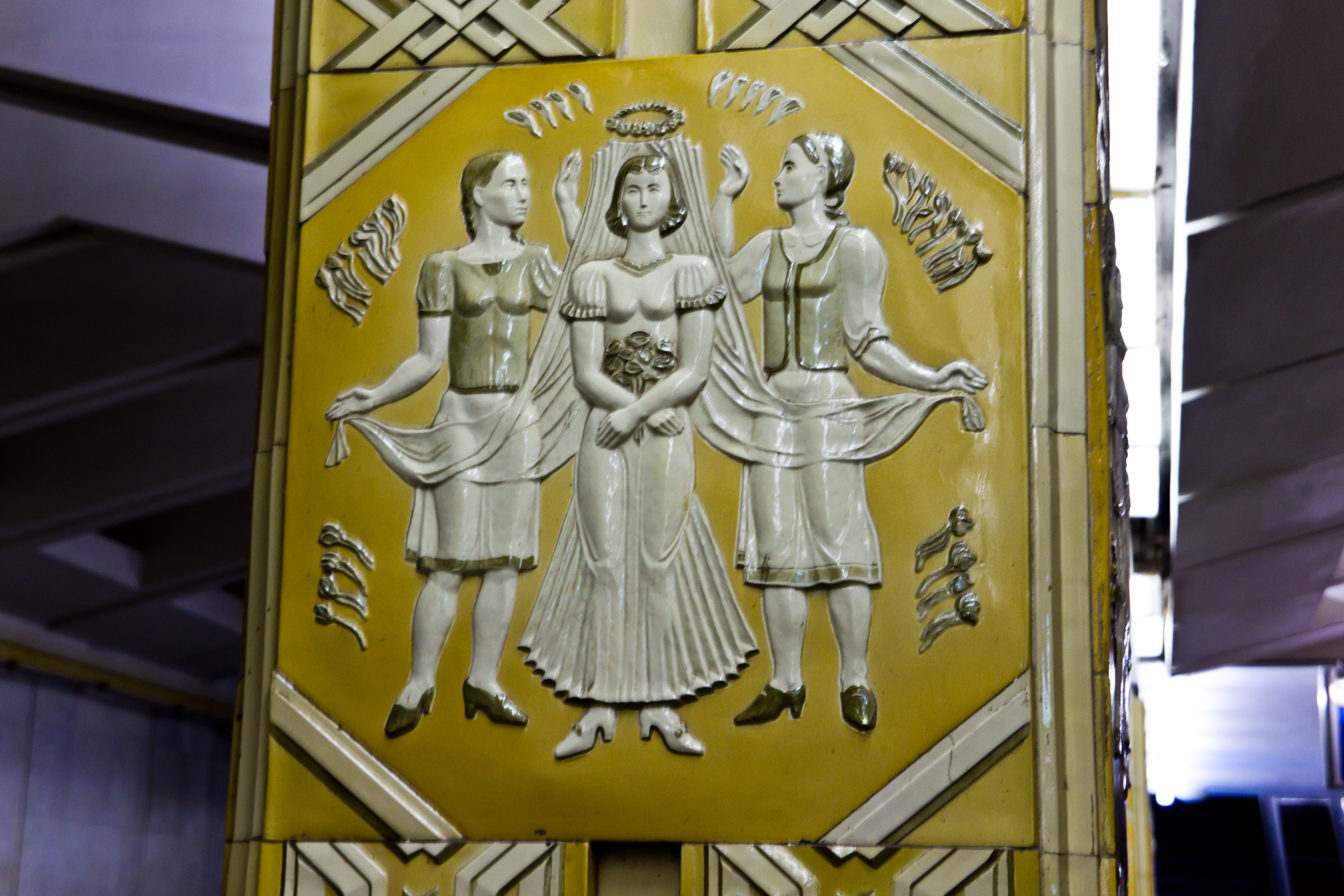
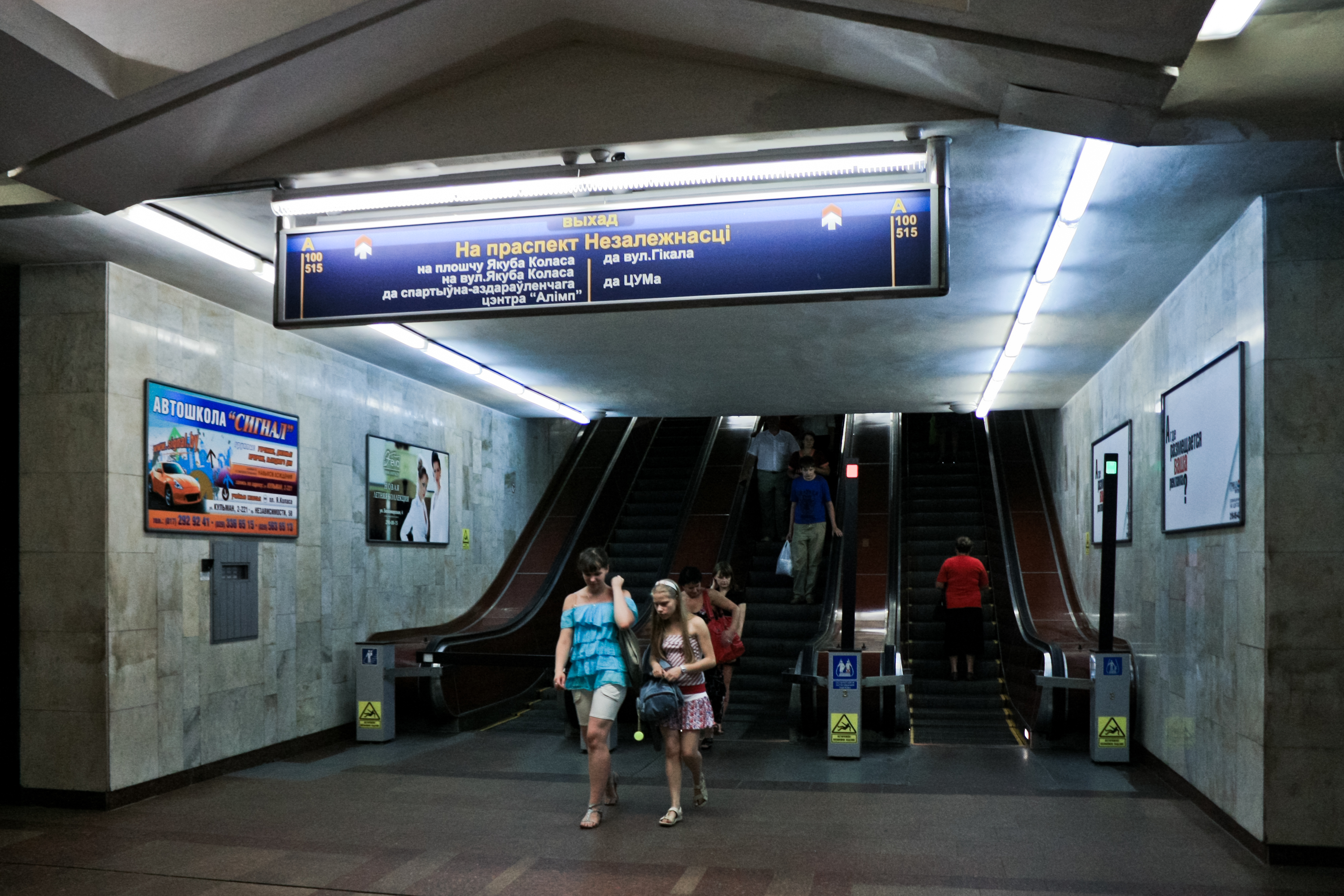
