= Chelyuskinites Park =

Park in Minsk, Belarus

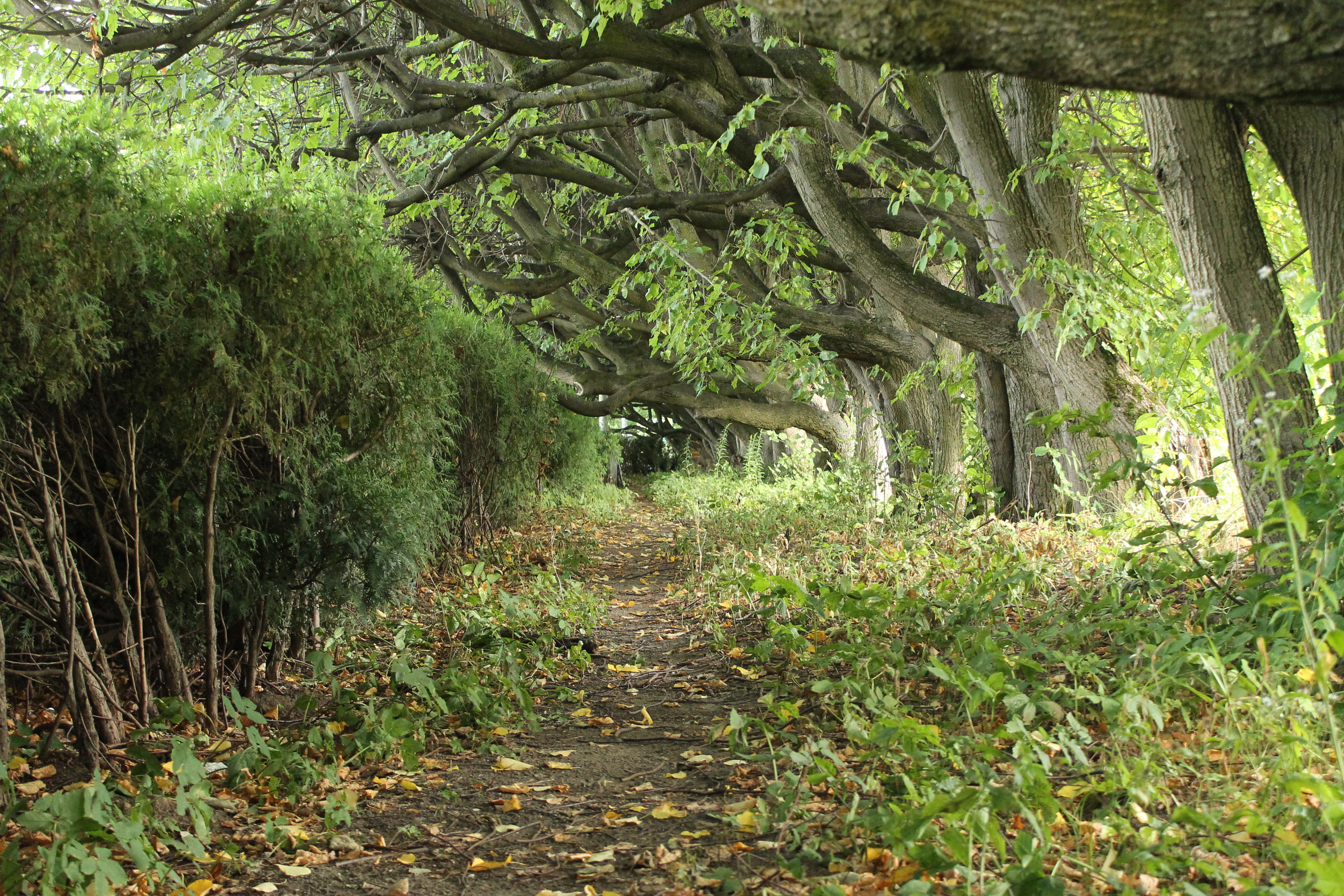
- Interactive map of Chelyuskinites Park
- Type: Urban forest park
- Nearest city: Minsk, Belarus
- Coordinates: 53°55′18″N 27°36′59″E
- Area: 78 hectares
- Created: 1928-1932

Chelyuskinetes Park or Park Čaliuskincaŭ (Belarusian: Парк Чалюскiнцаў, Russian: Парк Челюскинцев) is an urban forest park in Minsk, Belarus. The park's area is 78 hectares.

The park contains an amusement park. Other attractions include a Children's Railroad, operated exclusively by teenagers, and a cinema Raduga (English: rainbow). There is a Minsk Metro station "Park Čaliuskincaŭ" next to the park. The park is adjacent to the Minsk Botanical Garden.

The park was established during 1928-1932 as Kamaroúski Park and was renamed in 1934 for the crew of the SS Chelyuskin. It was based on the existing Kamaroúski Forest (Kamaroŭski lies), enriched by noble and decorative species of trees. Historically the park was part of the Wańkowicz family estate and was called the Wańkowicz Forest. According to the book "In the claws of the GPU" of the Belarusian writer Frantsishak Alyakhnovich, Kamaroúski Forest was the place of the regular executions of the prisoners of Minsk NKVD prison.
