= Pralyetarskaya (Minsk Metro) =

Minsk Metro station

Pralyetarskaya Пралетарская
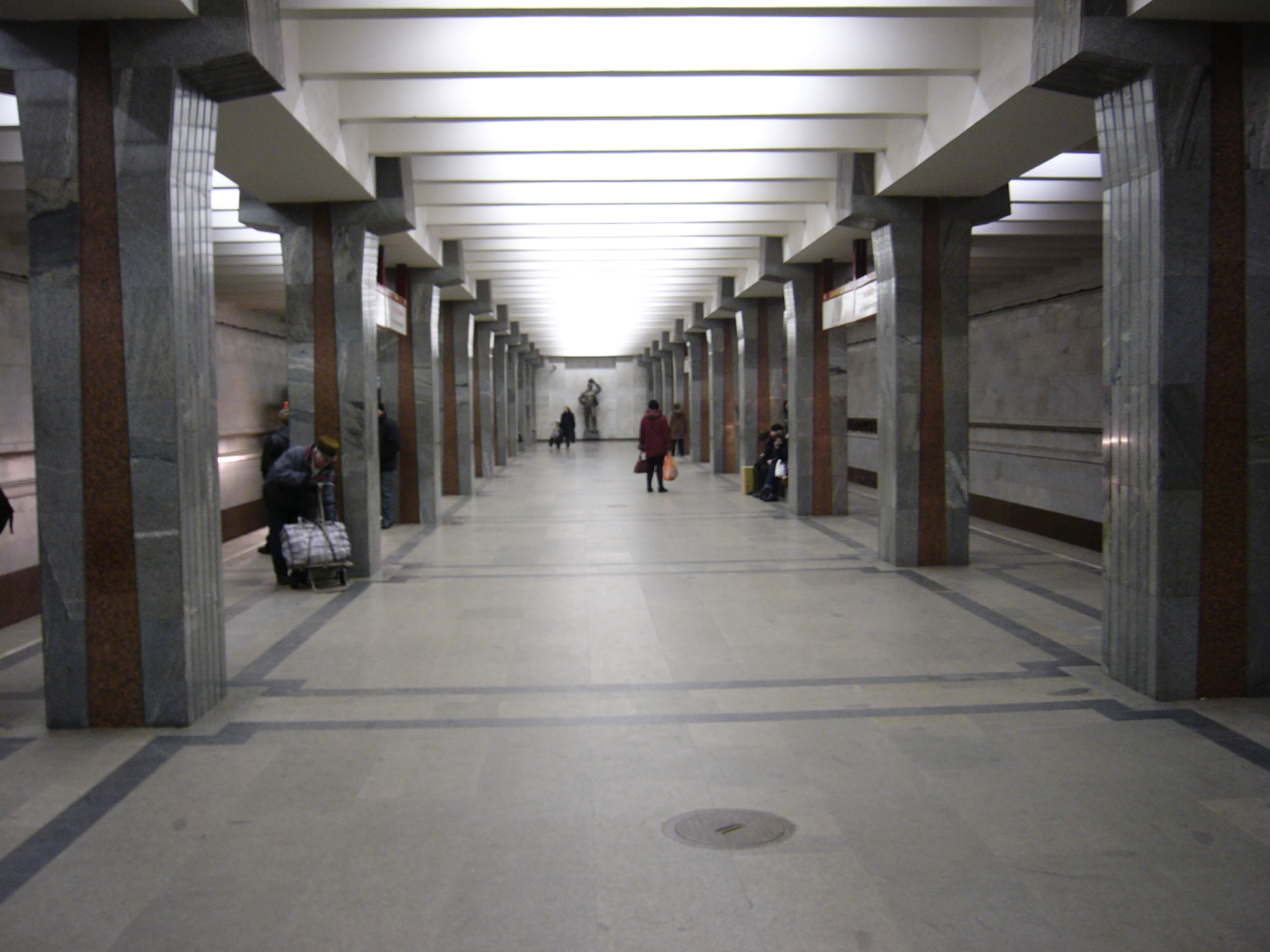
- Station Hall

General information
- Coordinates: 53°53′23.94″N 27°35′11.6″E
- System: Minsk Metro
- Owner: Minsk Metro
- Line: Awtazavodskaya line
- Platforms: 1 island platform
- Tracks: 2

Construction
- Structure type: Underground

Other information
- Station code: 214

History
- Opened: 31 December 1990; 35 years ago

Services
Preceding station	Minsk Metro	Following station
Pyershamayskaya towards Kamyennaya Horka	Awtazavodskaya line	Traktarny zavod towards Mahilyowskaya
Location
- Location within Belarus

Pralyetarskaya (Belarusian: Пралетарская, Pralietarskaja; Russian: Пролетарская) is a Minsk Metro station. Opened on 31 December 1990.

== Gallery ==
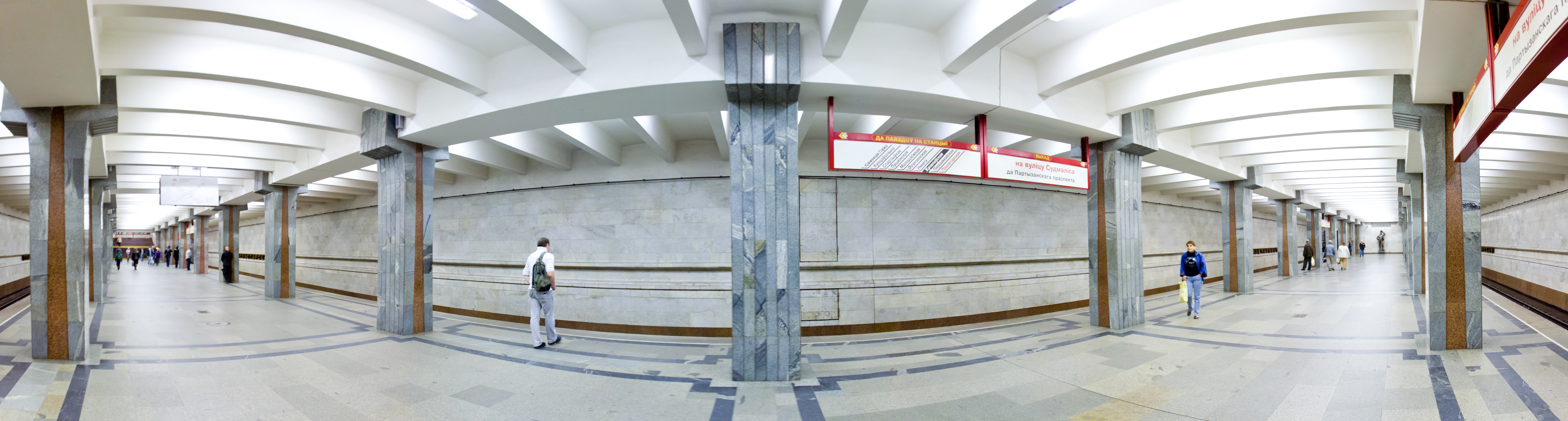

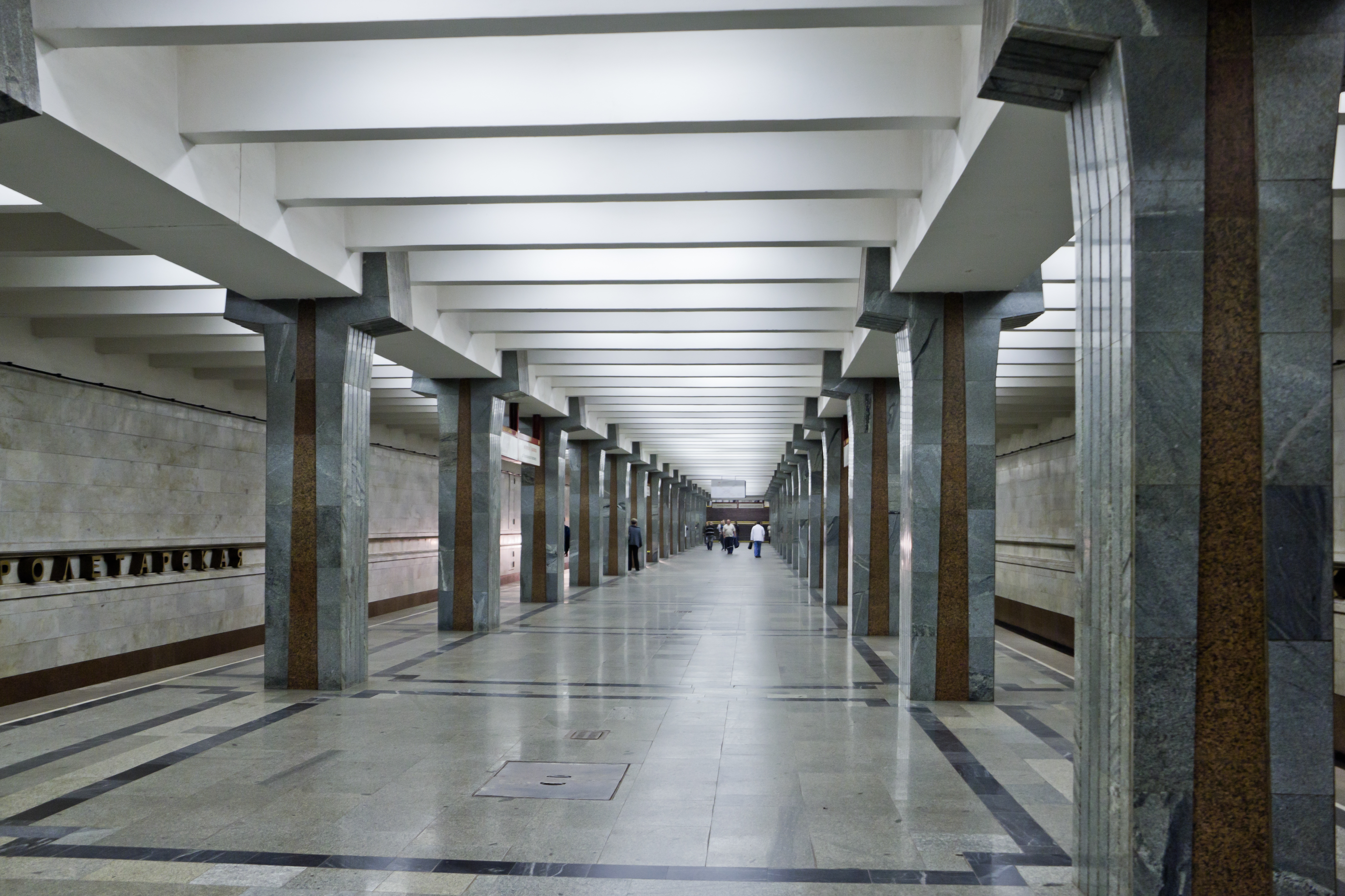

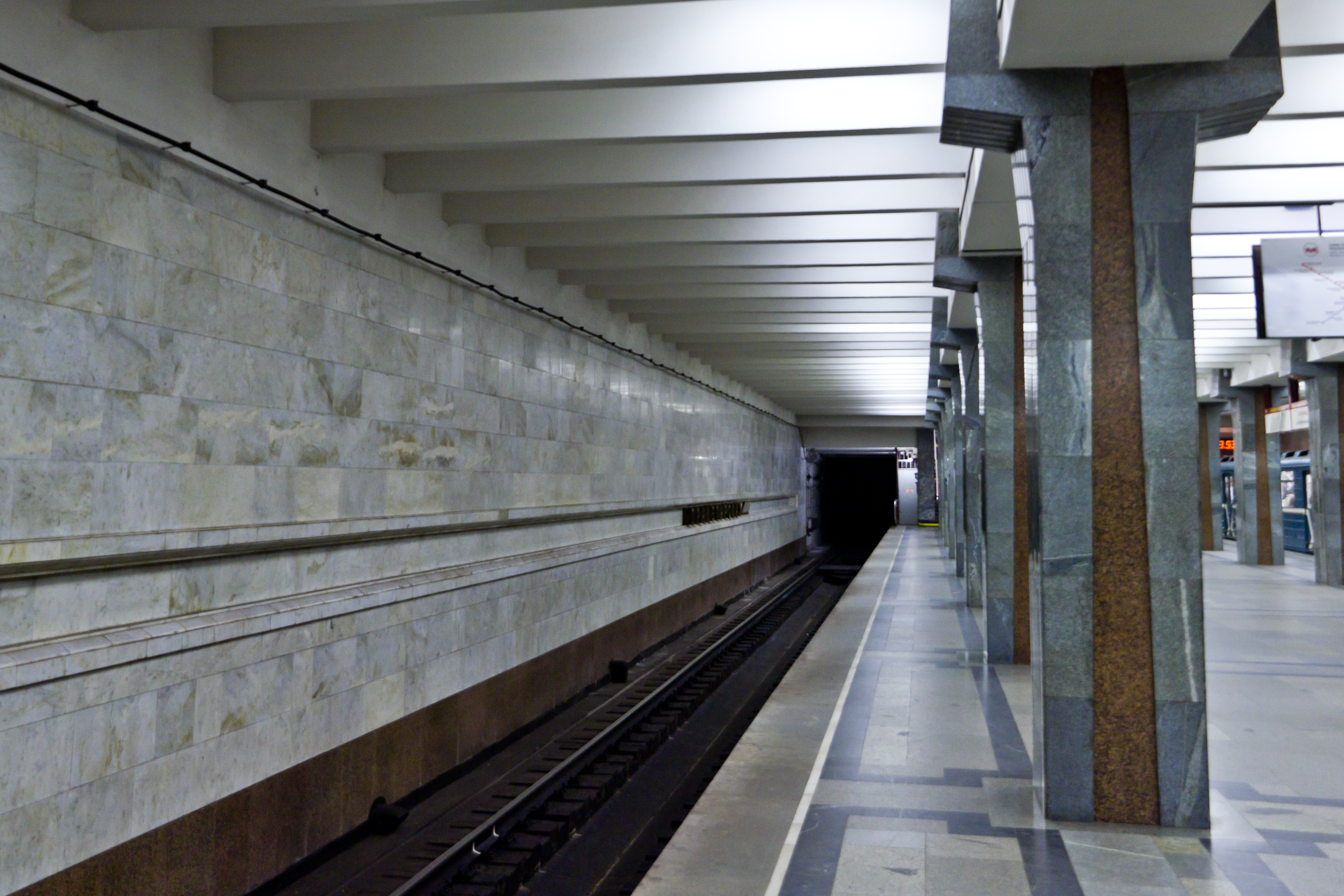

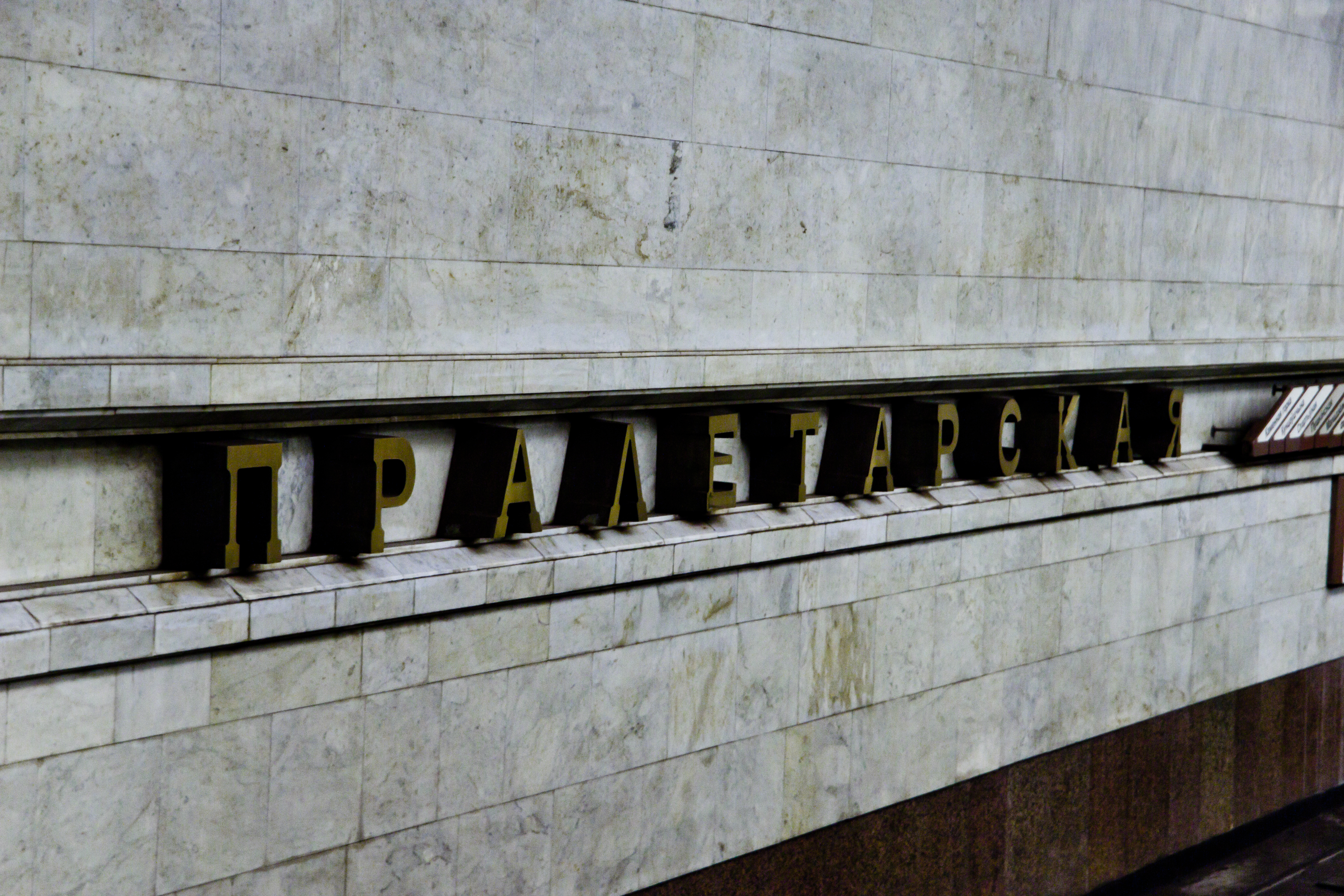

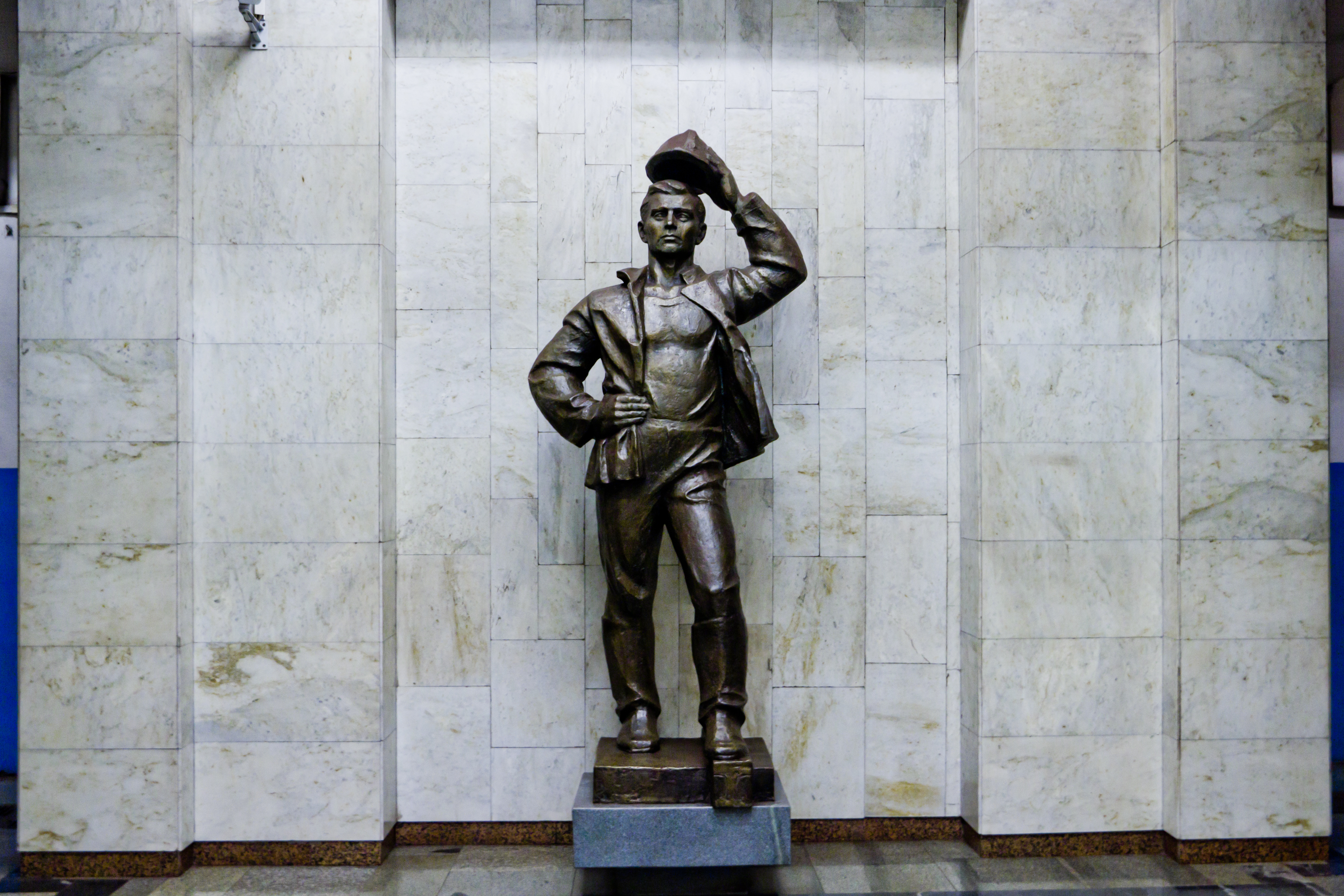

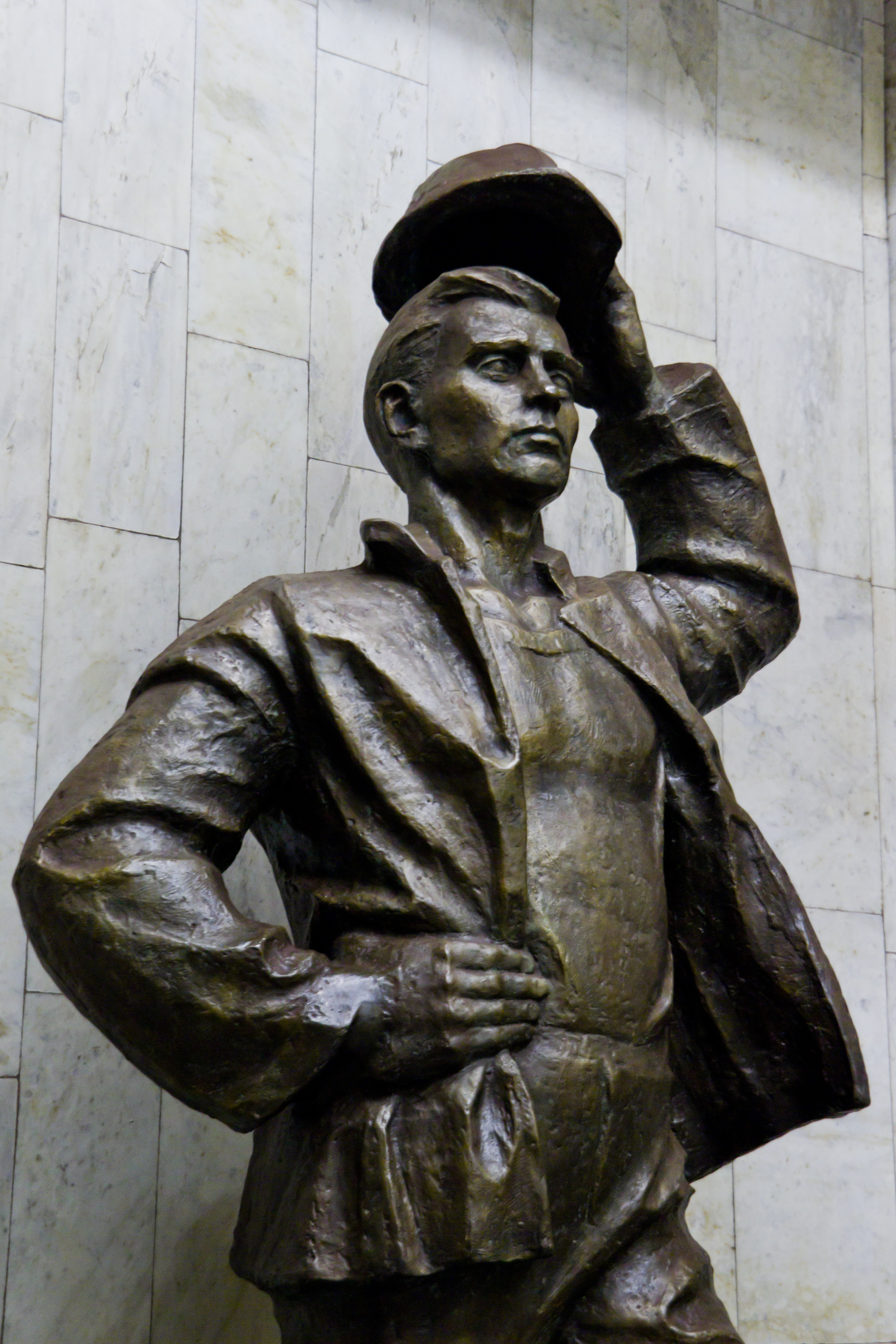

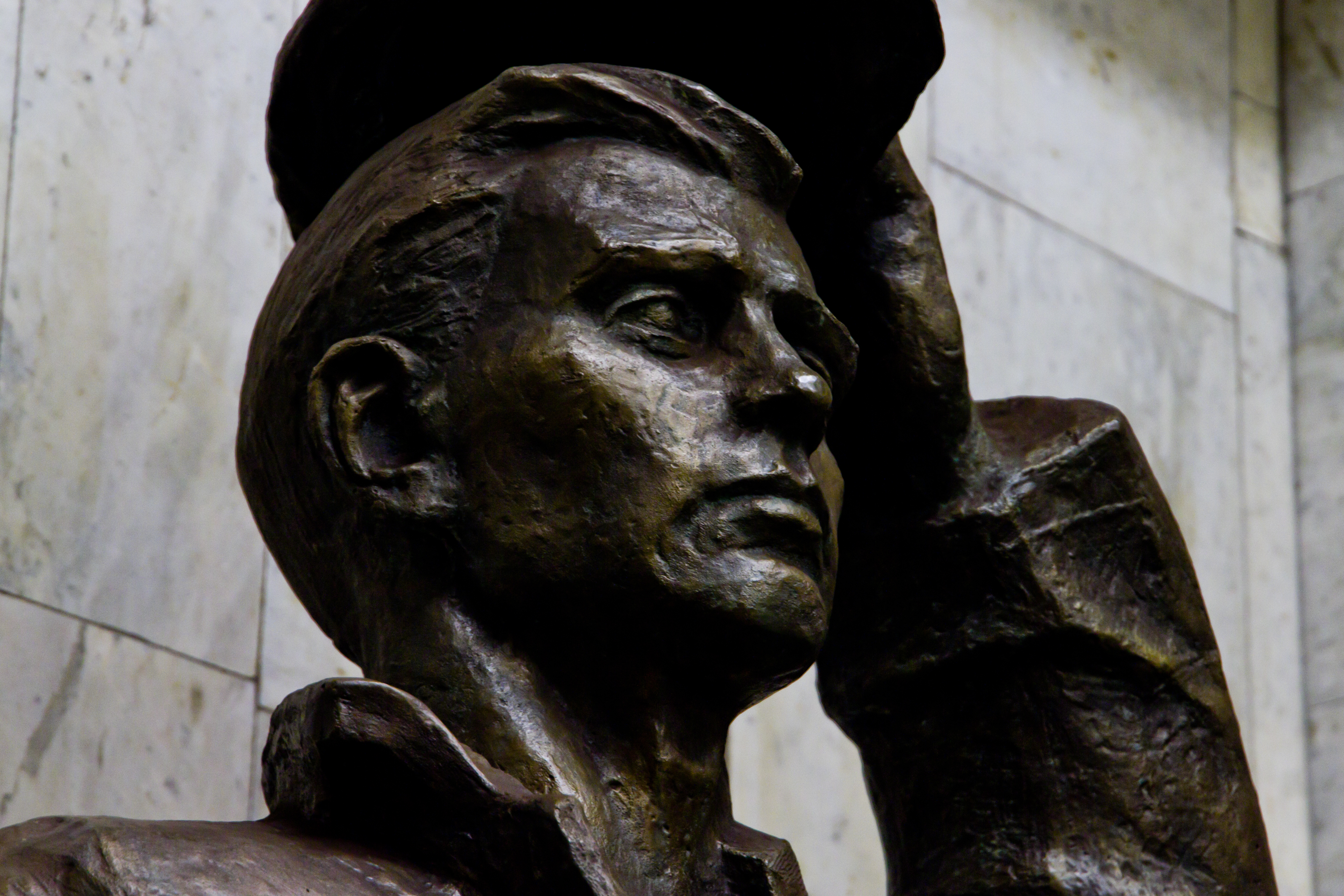
