= Kupalawskaya (Minsk Metro) =

Minsk Metro station

Kupalawskaya Купалаўская
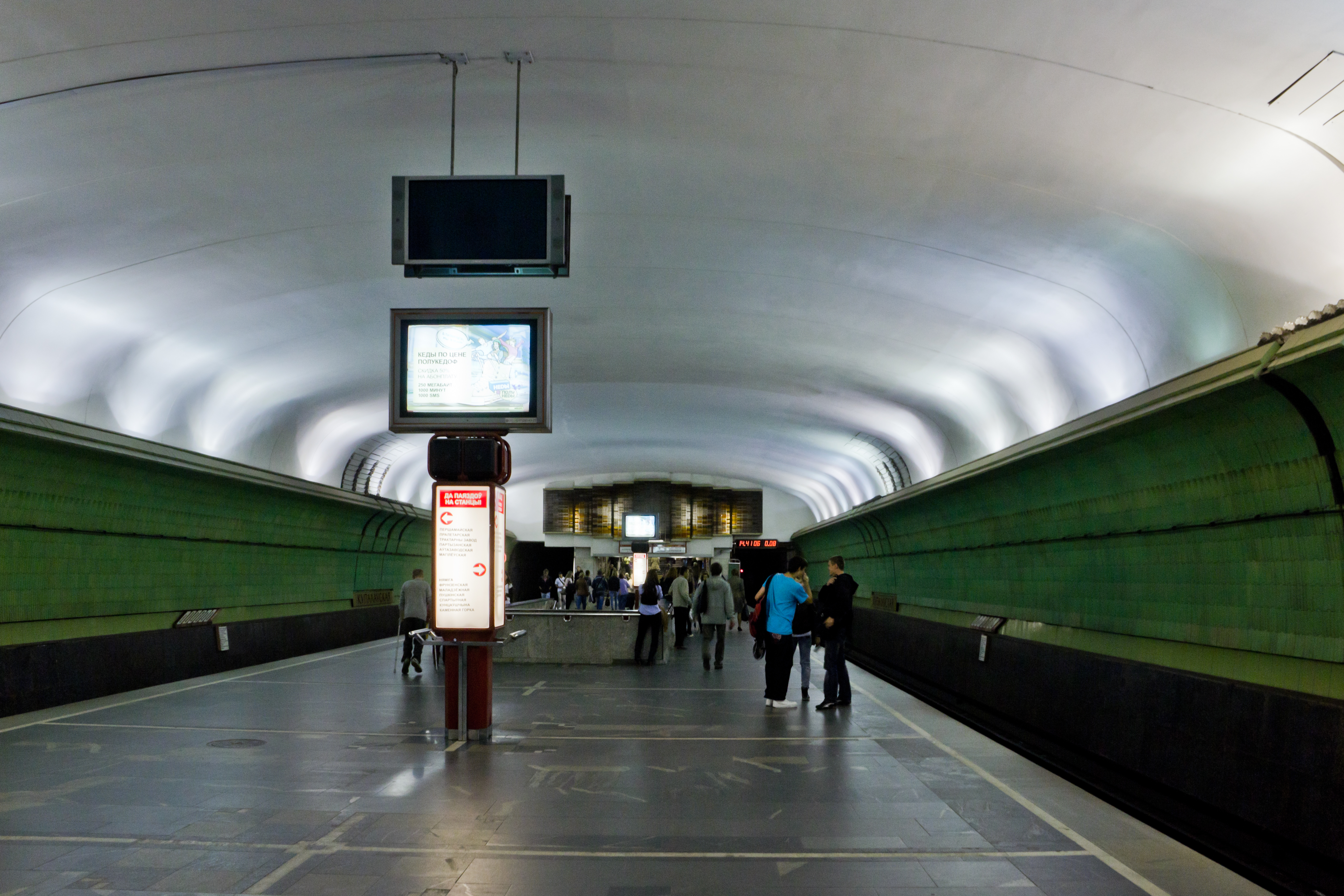
- Station Hall

General information
- Coordinates: 53°54′6.13″N 27°33′39.46″E
- System: Minsk Metro
- Owner: Minsk Metro
- Line: Awtazavodskaya line
- Platforms: 1 island platform
- Tracks: 2

Construction
- Structure type: Underground

Other information
- Station code: 216

History
- Opened: 31 December 1990; 35 years ago

Services
Preceding station	Minsk Metro	Following station
Nyamiha towards Kamyennaya Horka	Awtazavodskaya line	Pyershamayskaya towards Mahilyowskaya
Transfer at Kastrychnitskaya
Ploshcha Pyeramohi towards Uručča	Maskoŭskaja line transfer at Kastrychnitskaya	Ploshcha Lyenina towards Malinawka
Location
- Location within Belarus

Kupalawskaya (Belarusian: Купалаўская) is a Minsk Metro station. Opened on December 31, 1990.

The station is one of three on the Minsk Metro to have been built with an entrance in an existing building, the other two being Kastrychnitskaya and Ploshcha Lyenina.

== 2011 bombing ==
The adjacent Kastrychnitskaya station was the site of a bombing on April 11, 2011.

== Gallery ==
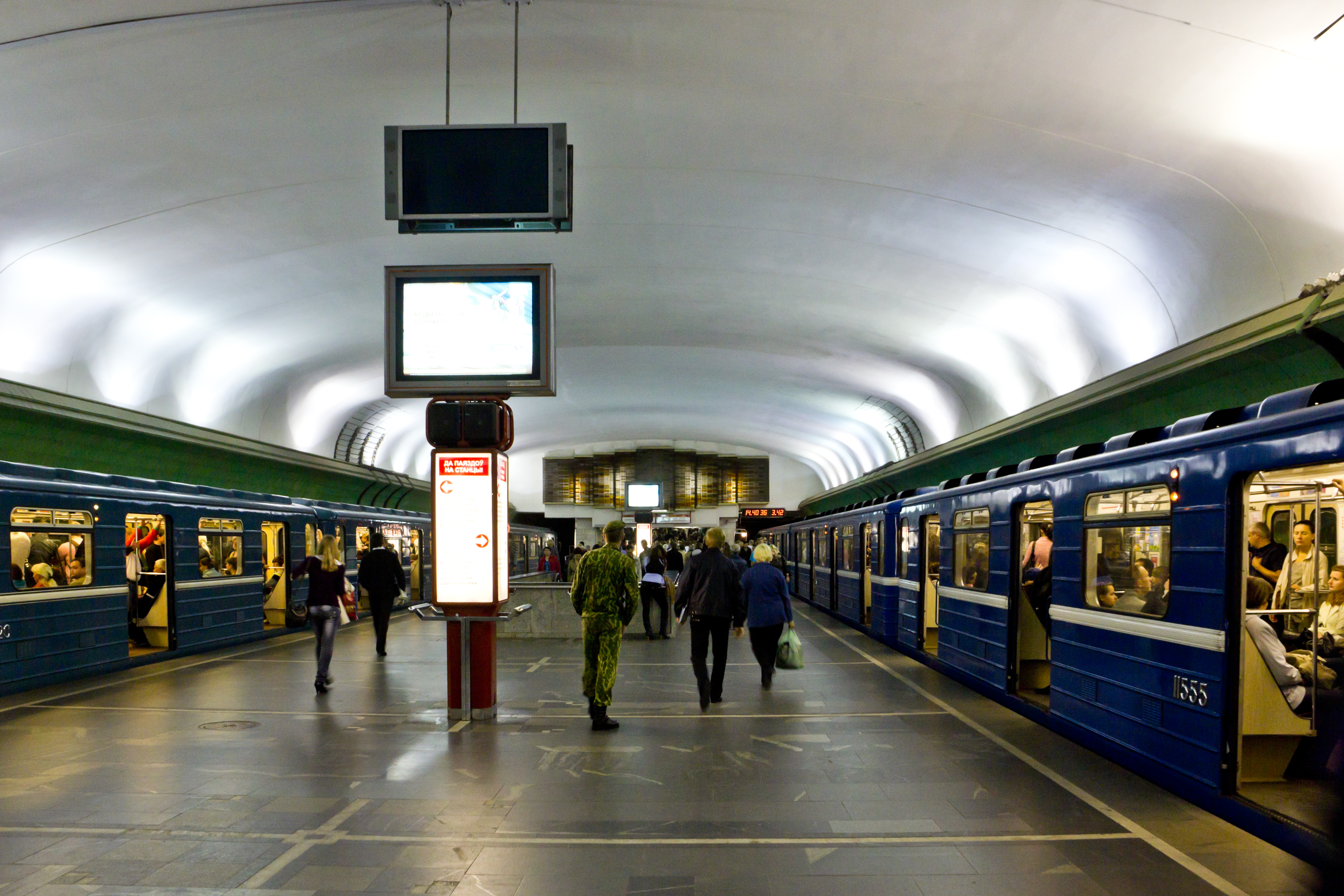

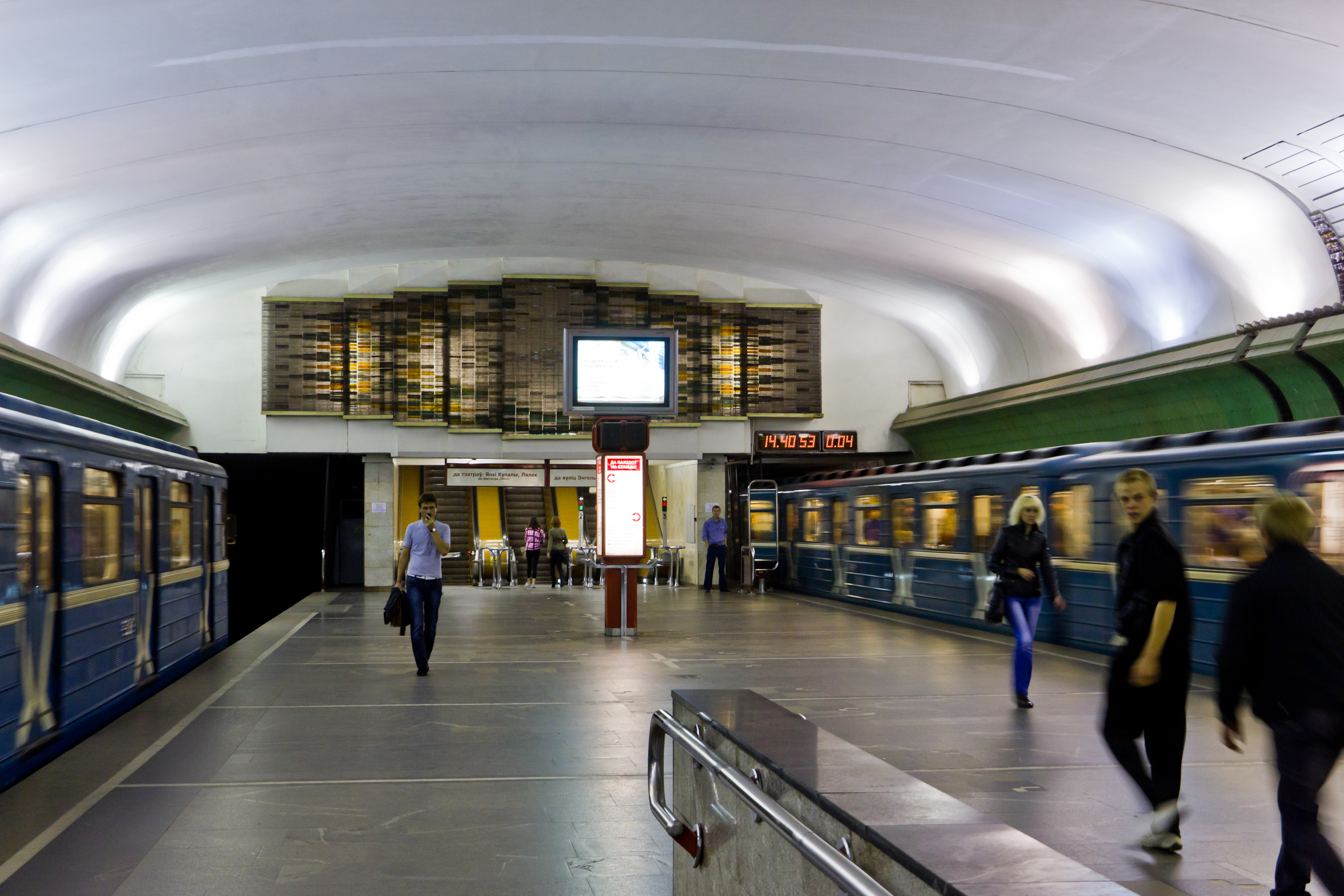

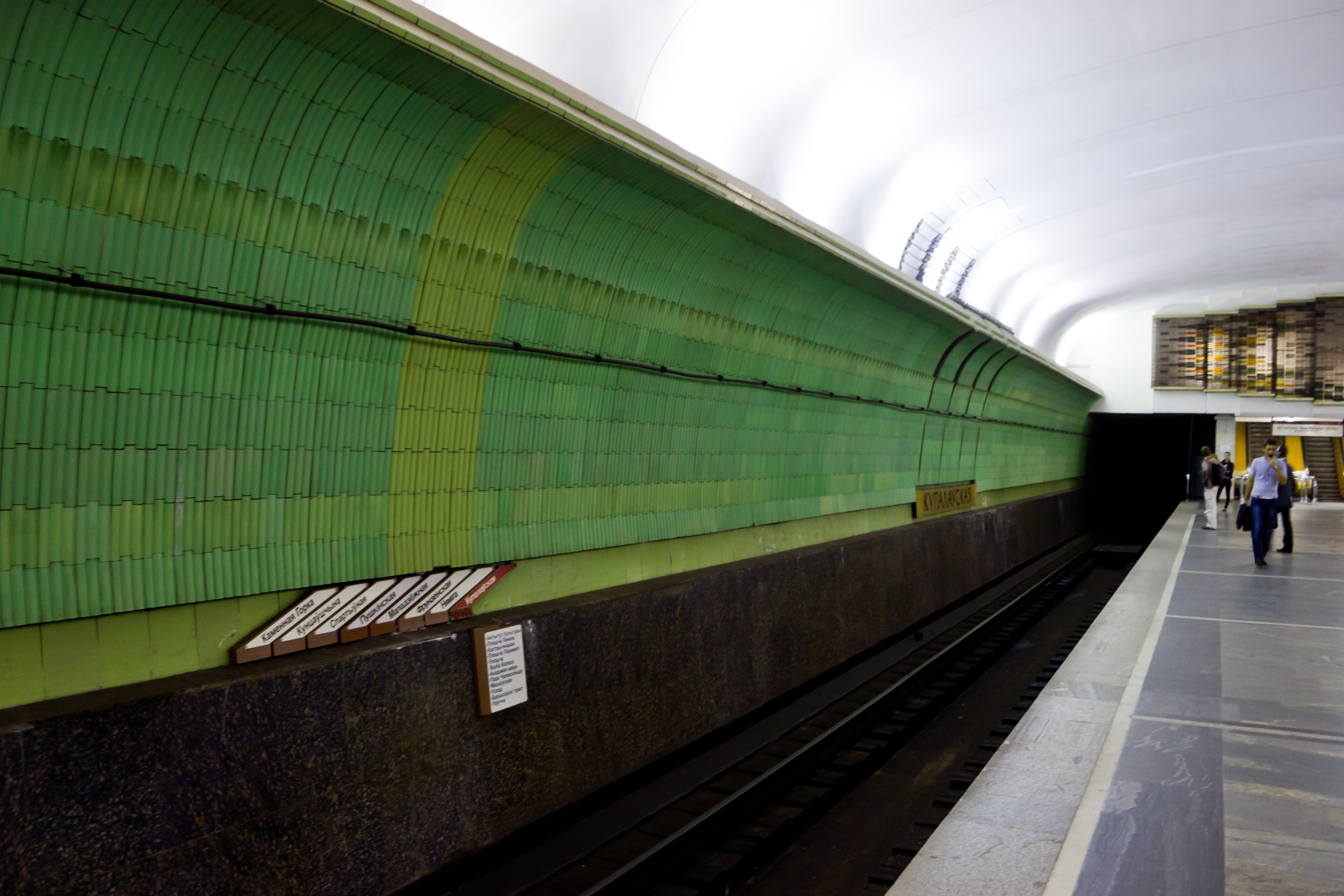

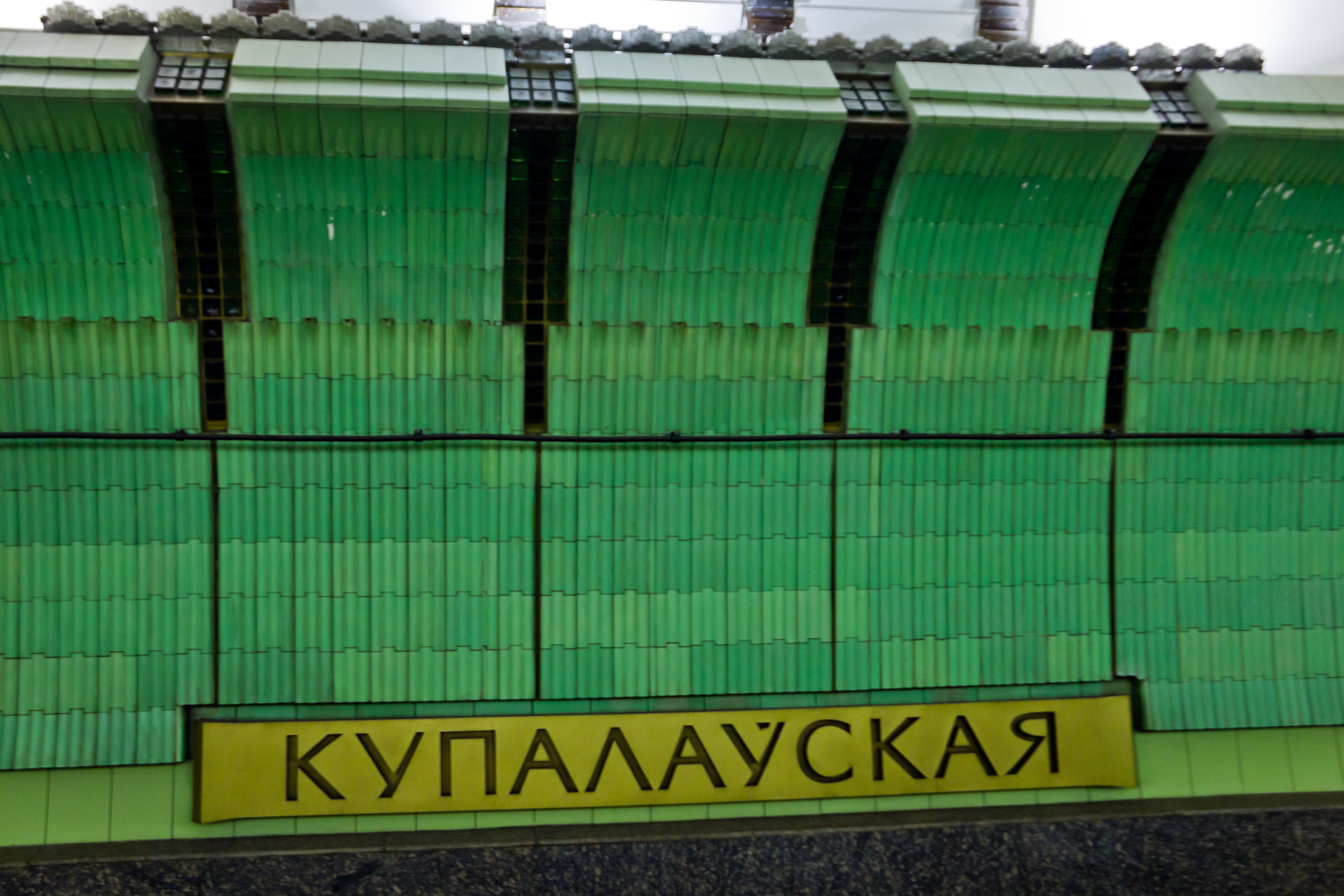

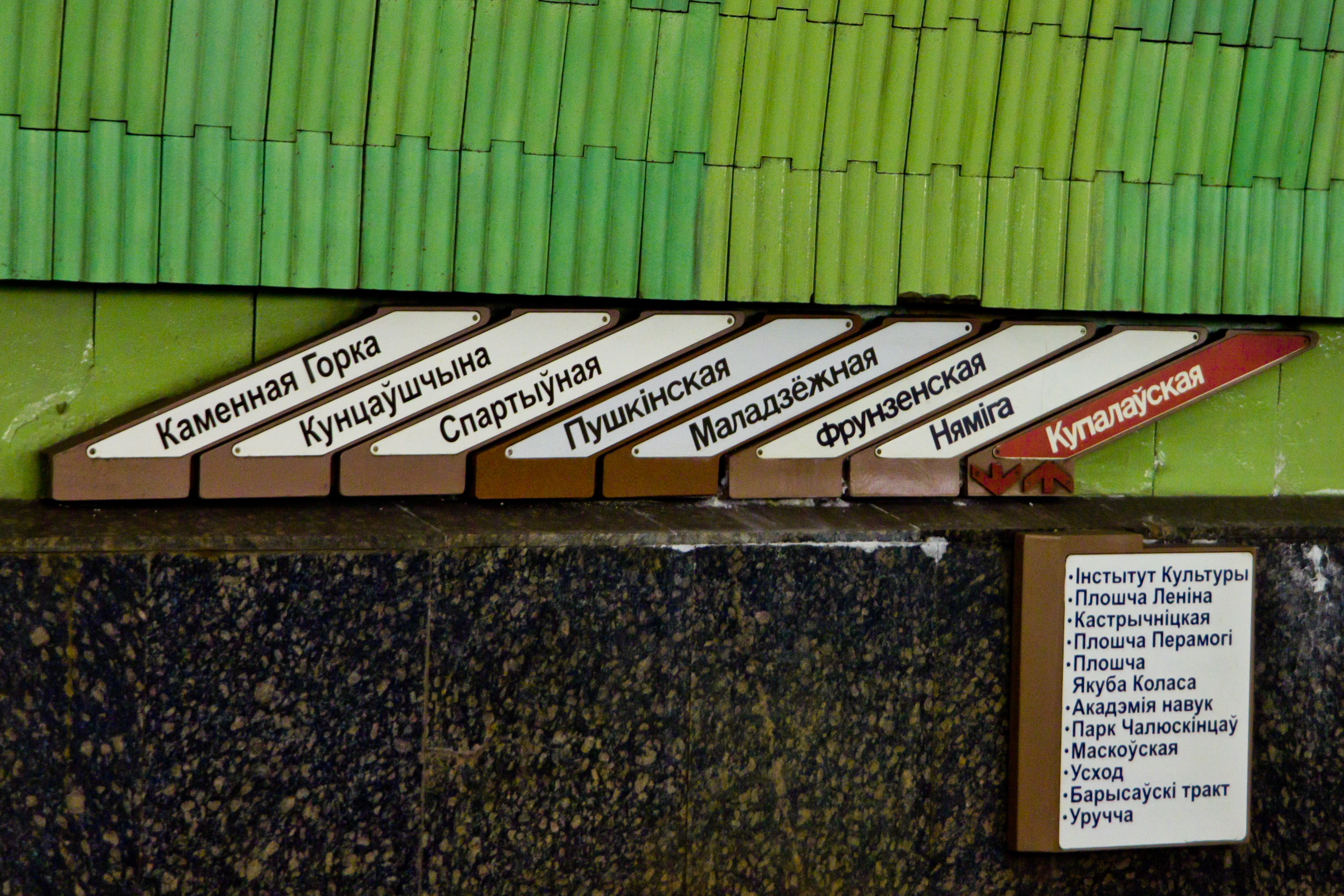

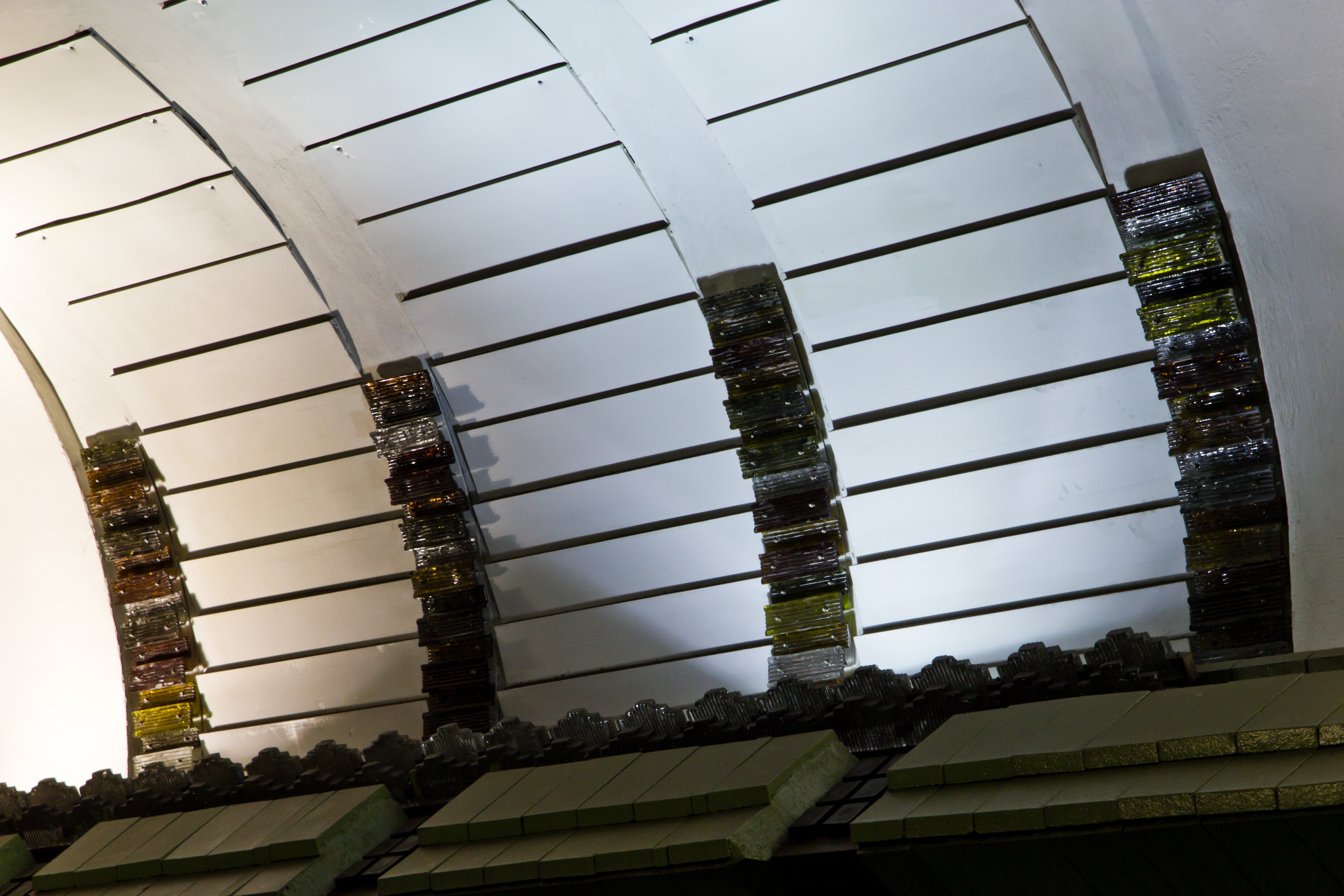

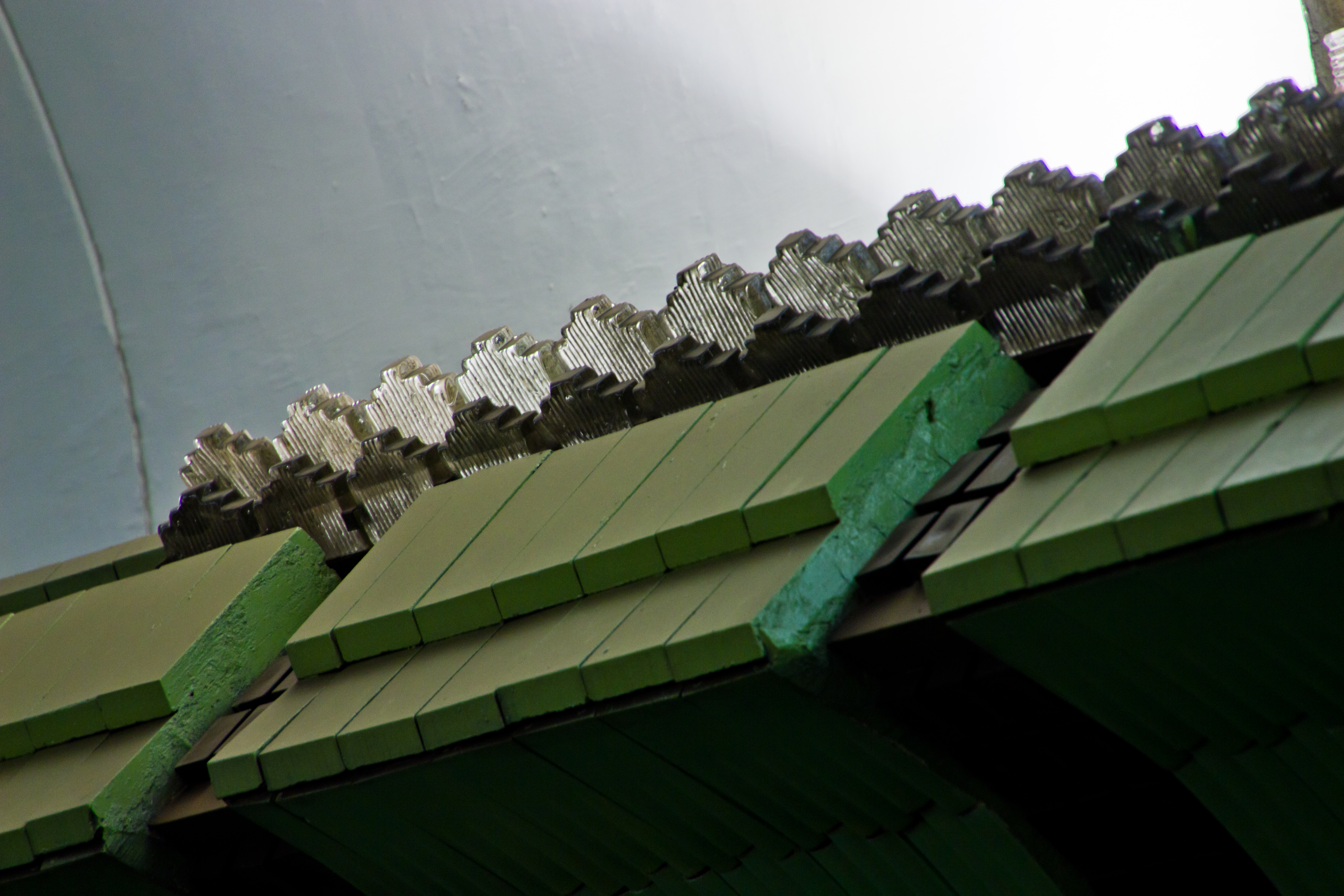

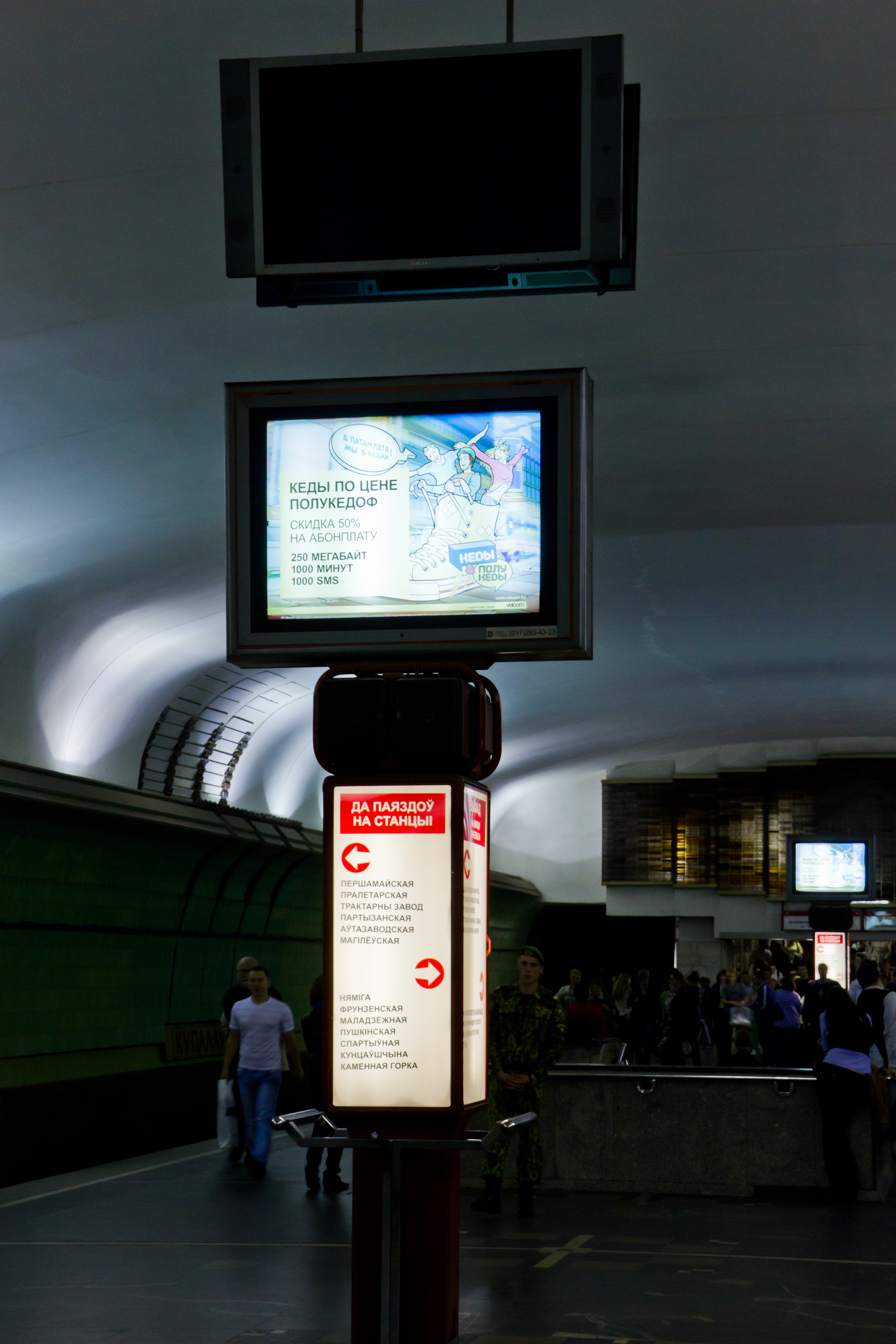

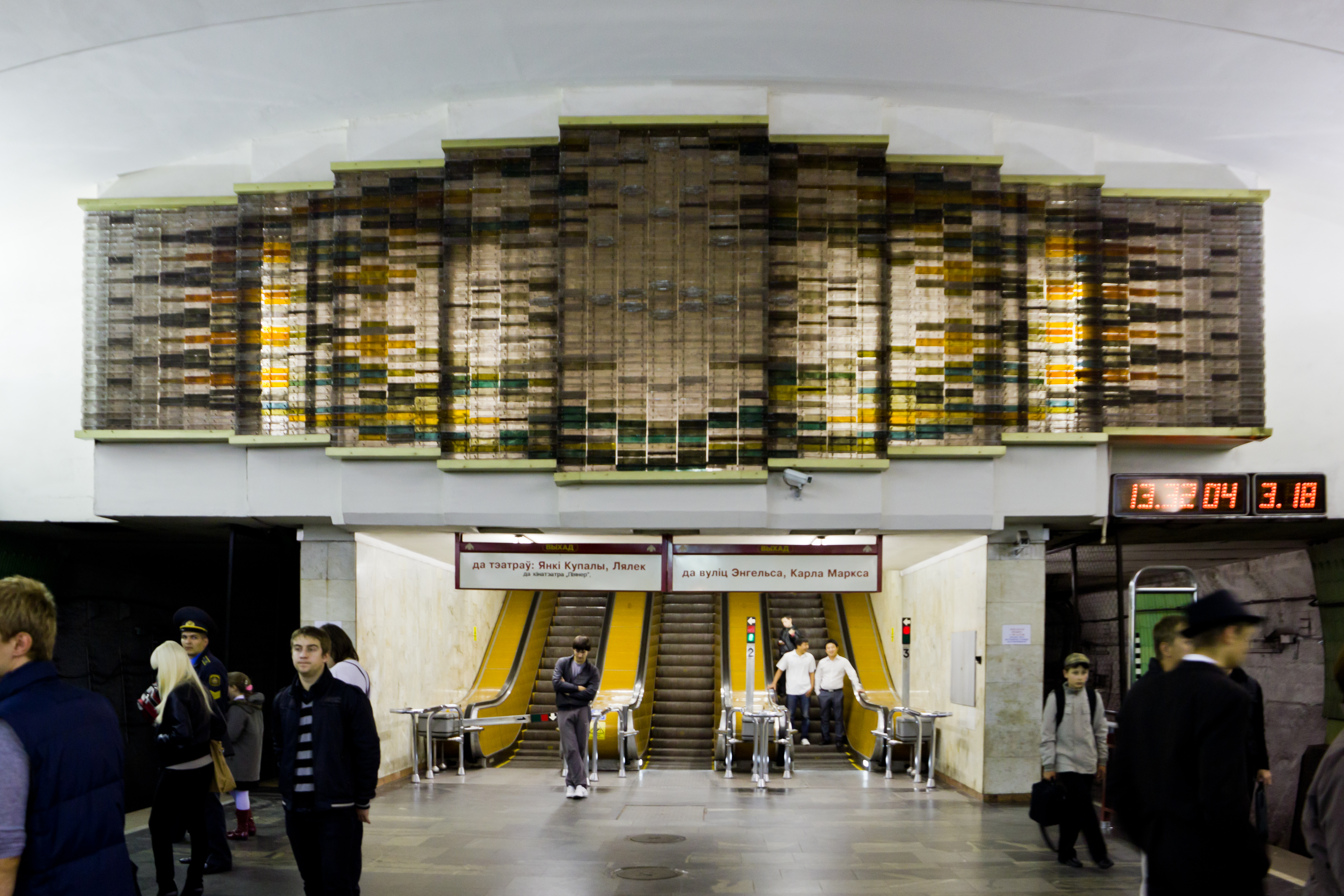
