= Pyershamayskaya (Minsk Metro) =

Minsk Metro station

Pyershamayskaya Першамайская
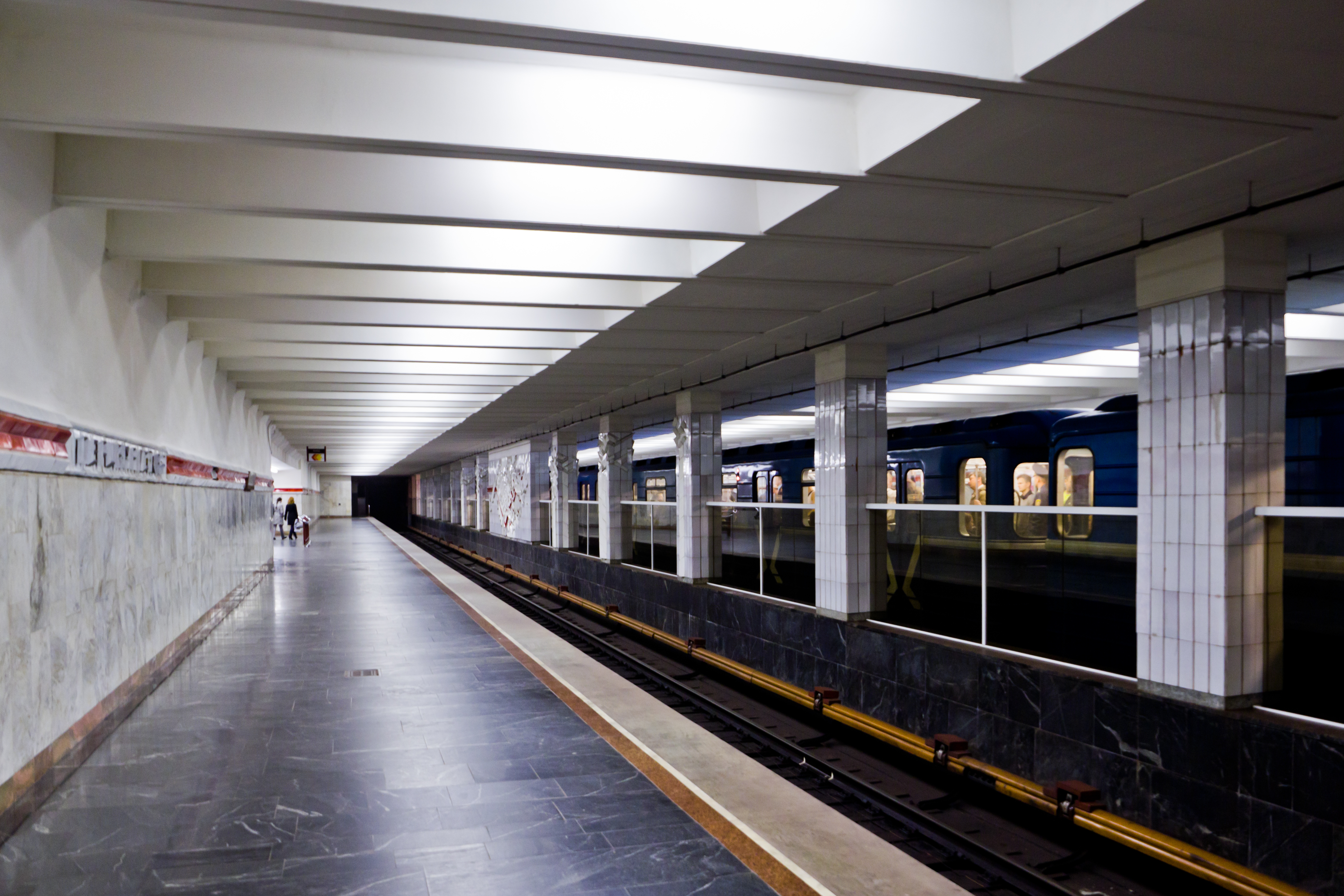
- Station Hall

General information
- Coordinates: 53°53′38″N 27°34′13″E
- System: Minsk Metro
- Owner: Minsk Metro
- Line: Awtazavodskaya line
- Platforms: 2 side platforms
- Tracks: 2

Construction
- Structure type: Underground

Other information
- Station code: 215

History
- Opened: 28 May 1991; 35 years ago

Services
Preceding station	Minsk Metro	Following station
Kupalawskaya towards Kamyennaya Horka	Awtazavodskaya line	Pralyetarskaya towards Mahilyowskaya
Location
- Location within Belarus

Pyershamayskaya (Belarusian: Першамайская; Russian: Первомайская; lit: "1st May station") is a Minsk Metro station. It was opened on 28 May 1991.

== Gallery ==
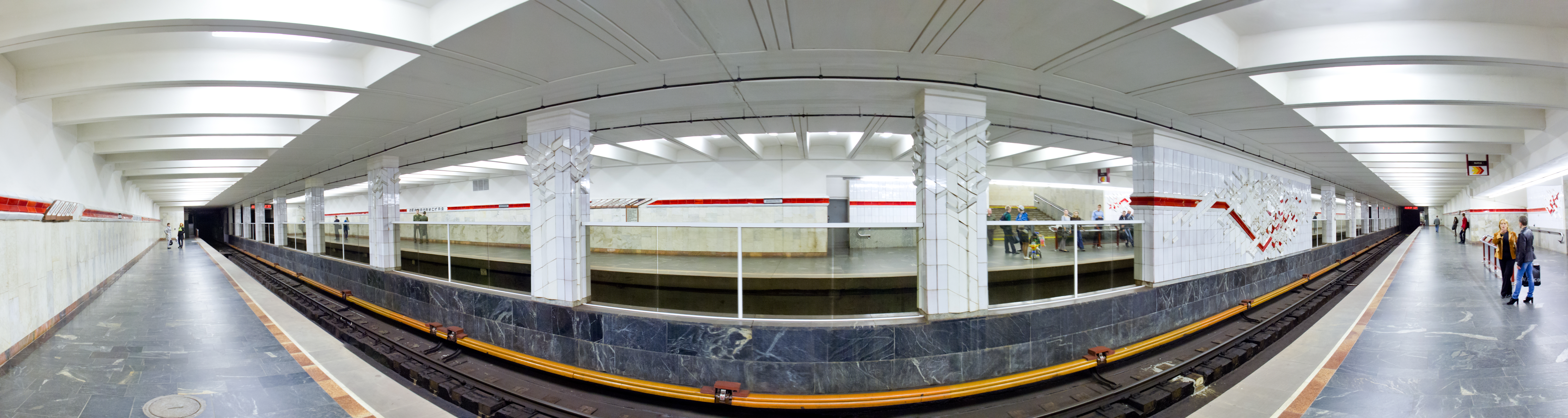

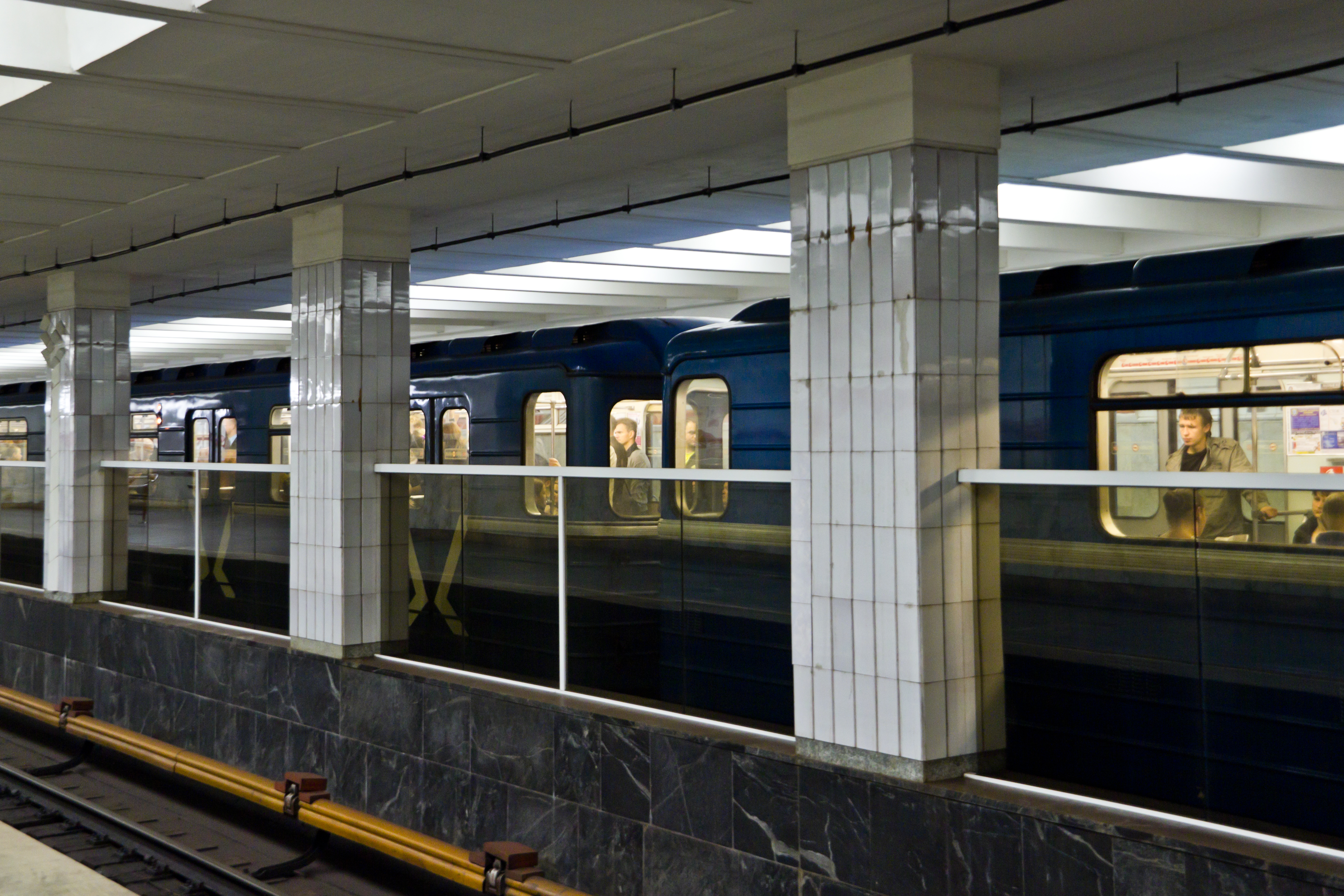

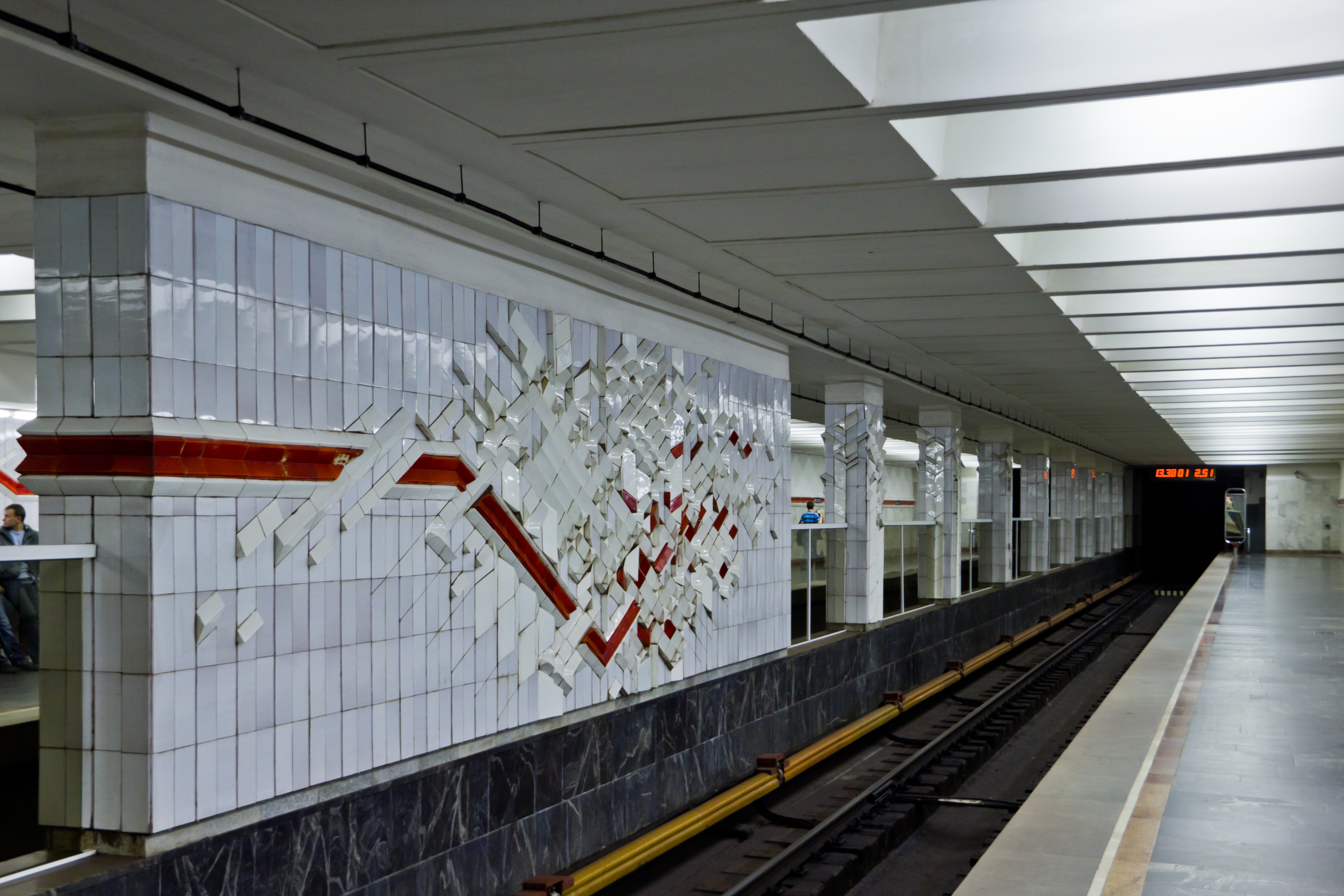

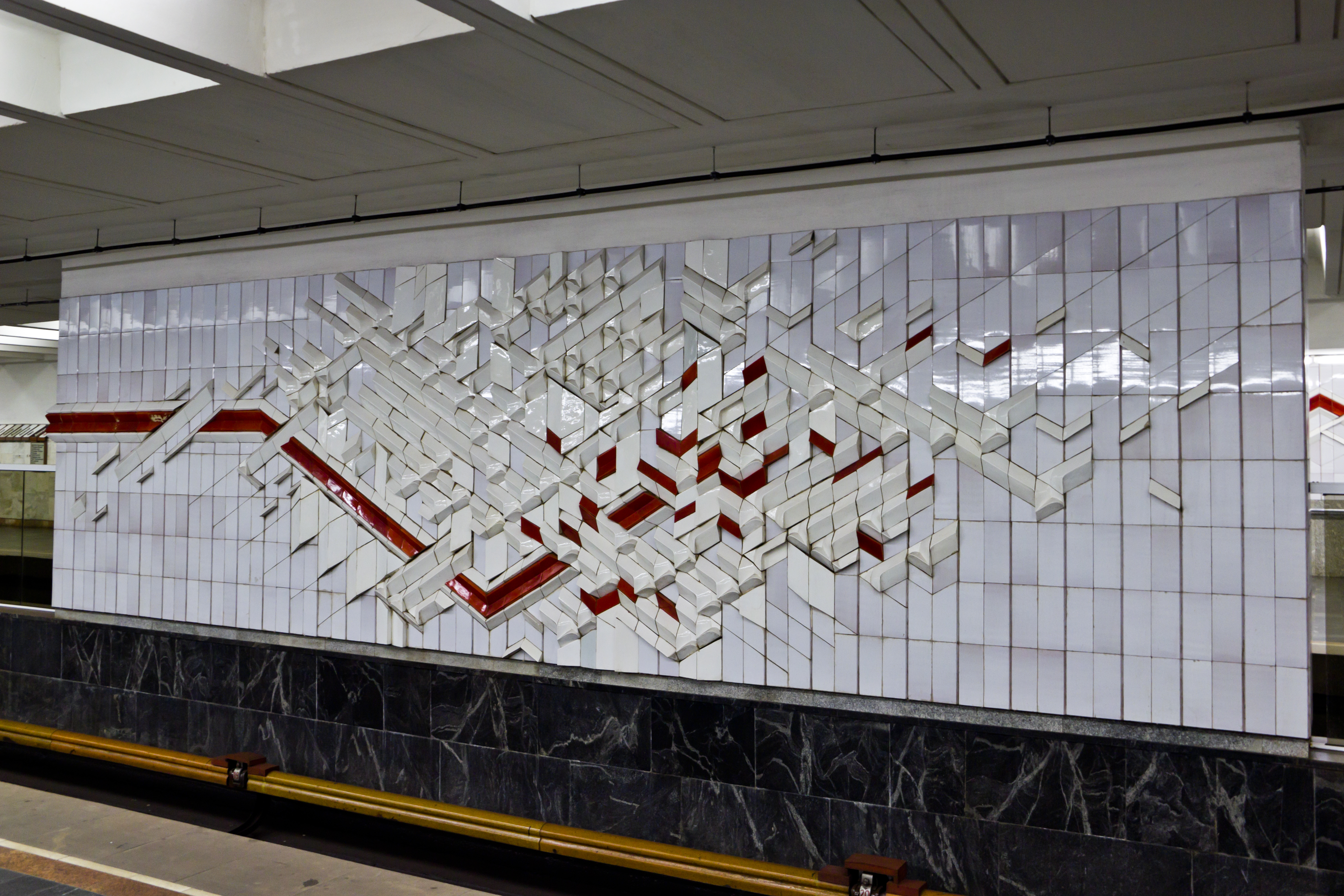

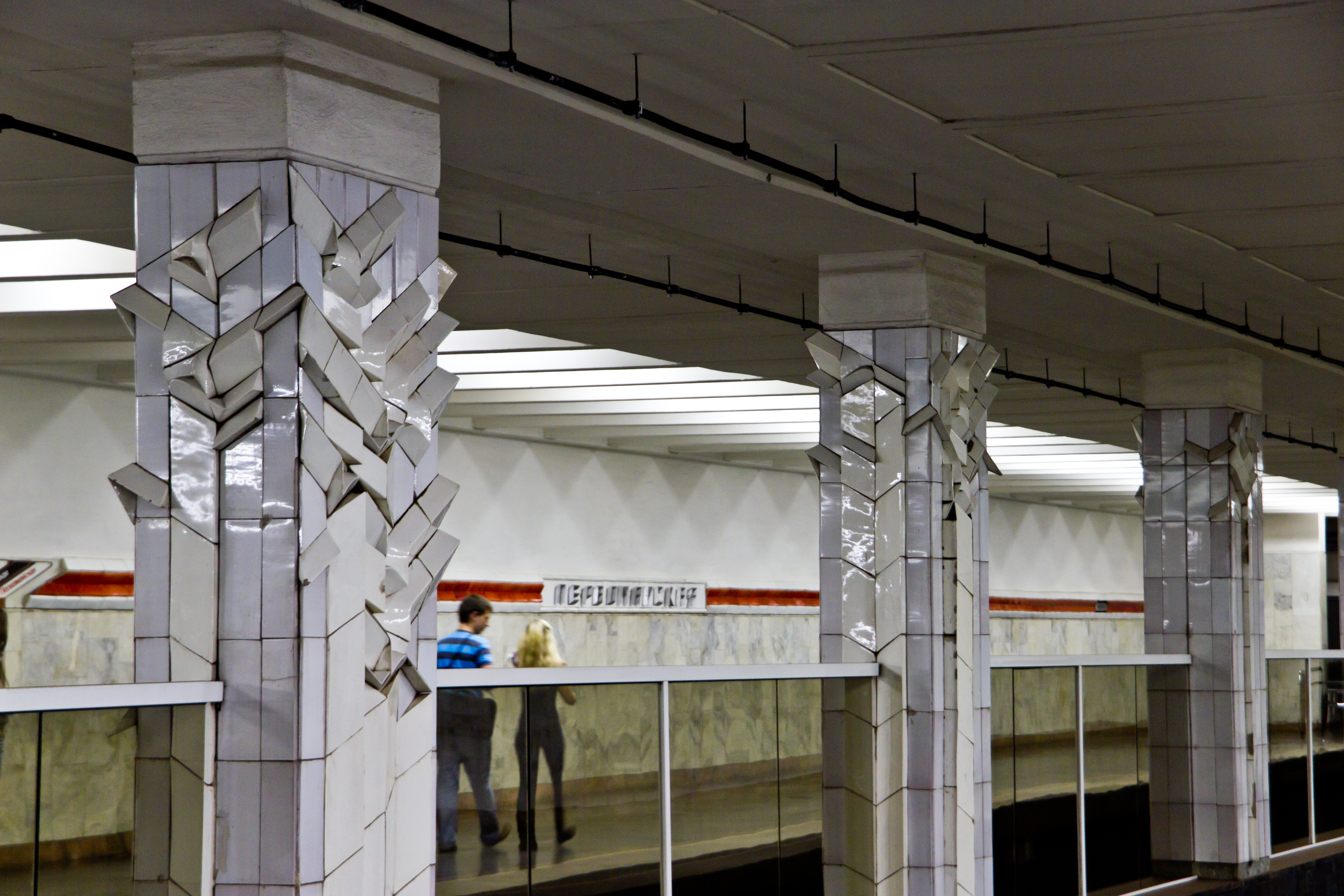

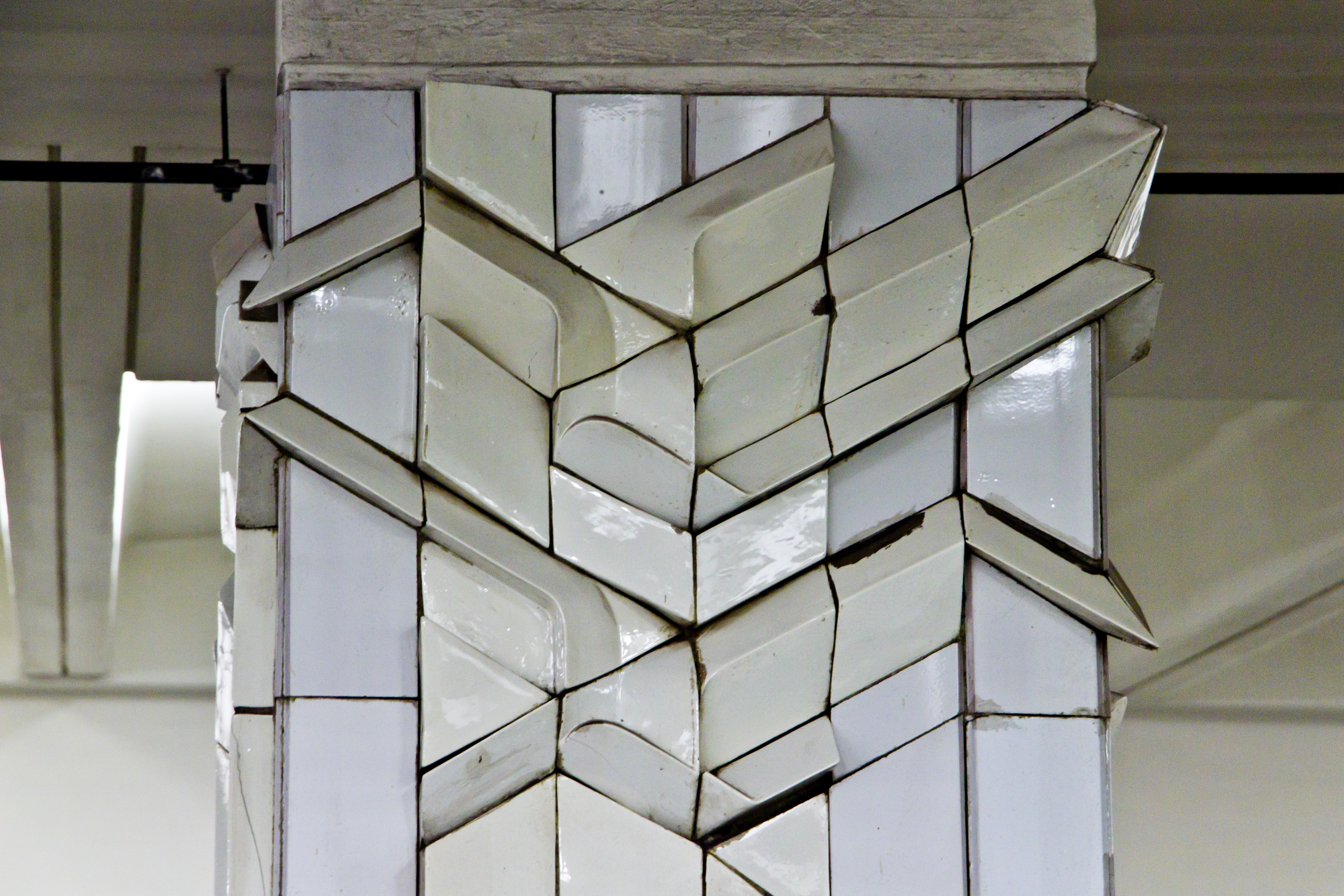

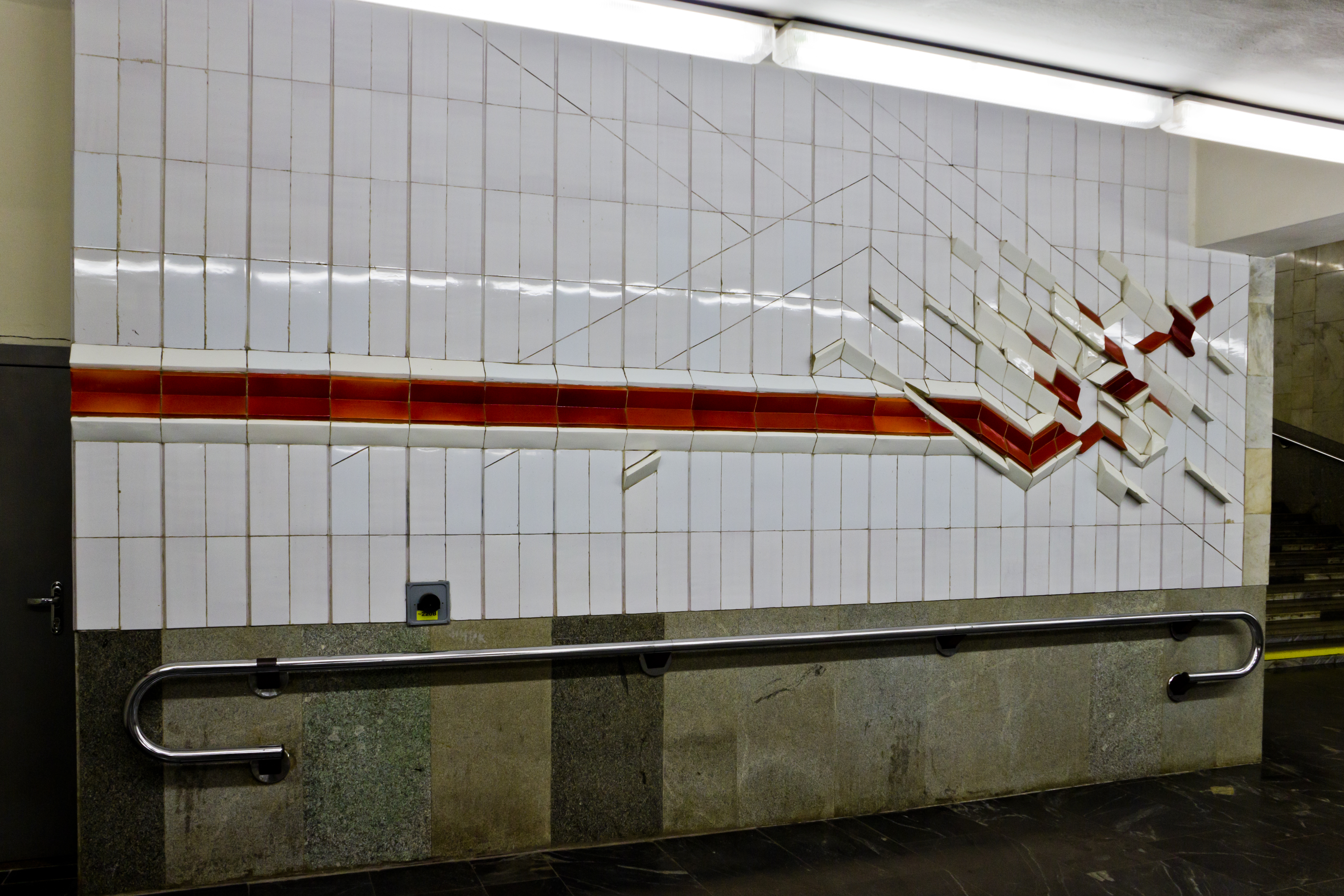
