= Traktarny zavod (Minsk Metro) =

Minsk Metro station

Traktarny zavod Трактарны завод
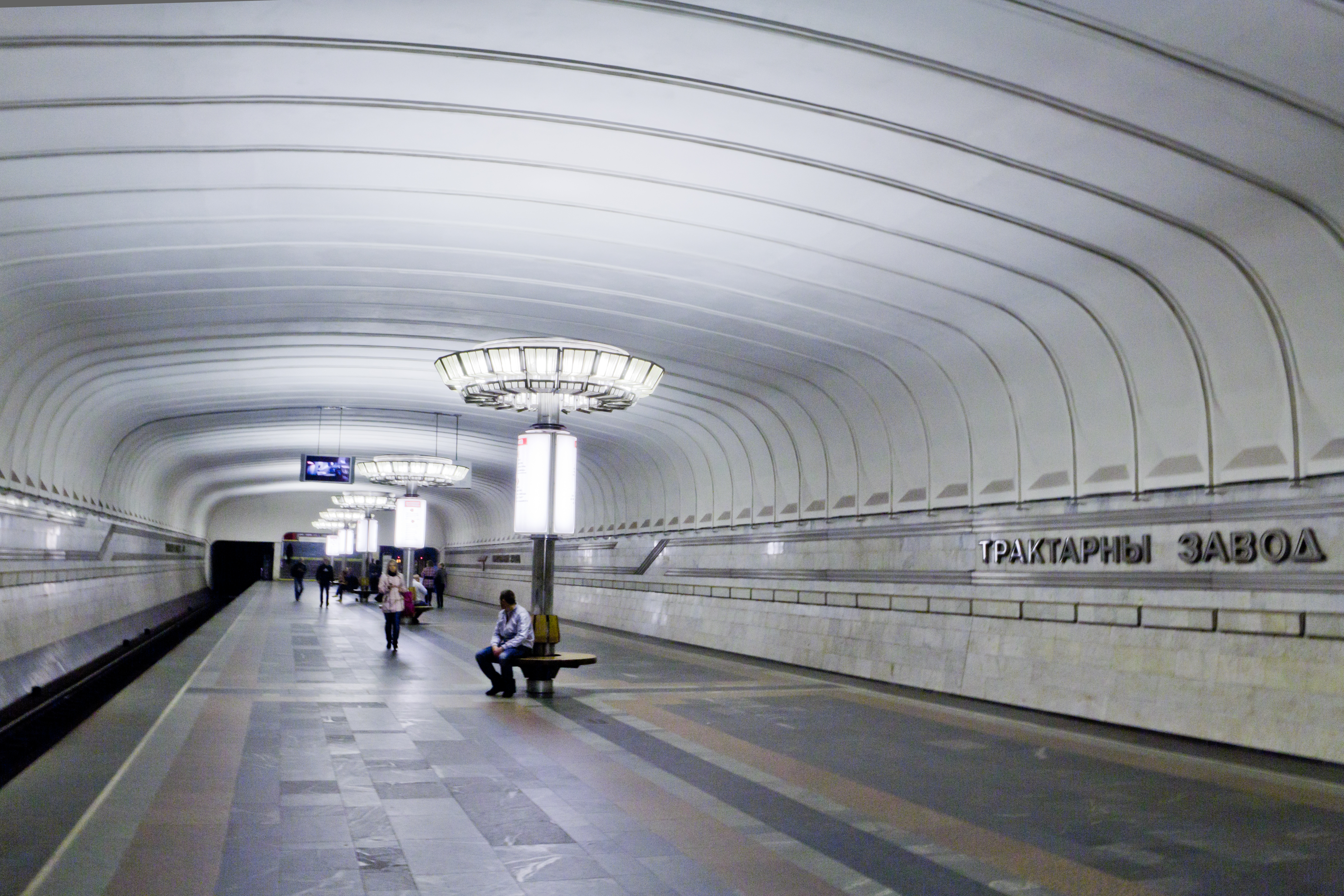

General information
- Coordinates: 53°53′23.37″N 27°36′54.2″E
- System: Minsk Metro
- Owner: Minsk Metro
- Line: Awtazavodskaya line
- Platforms: 1 island platform
- Tracks: 2

Construction
- Structure type: Underground

Other information
- Station code: 213

History
- Opened: 31 December 1990; 35 years ago

Services
Preceding station	Minsk Metro	Following station
Pralyetarskaya towards Kamyennaya Horka	Awtazavodskaya line	Partyzanskaya towards Mahilyowskaya
Location
- Location within Belarus

Traktarny zavod (Belarusian: Трактарны завод; Russian: Тракторный завод; lit: "Tractor Factory") is a Minsk Metro station. It opened on 31 December 1990.

== Gallery ==
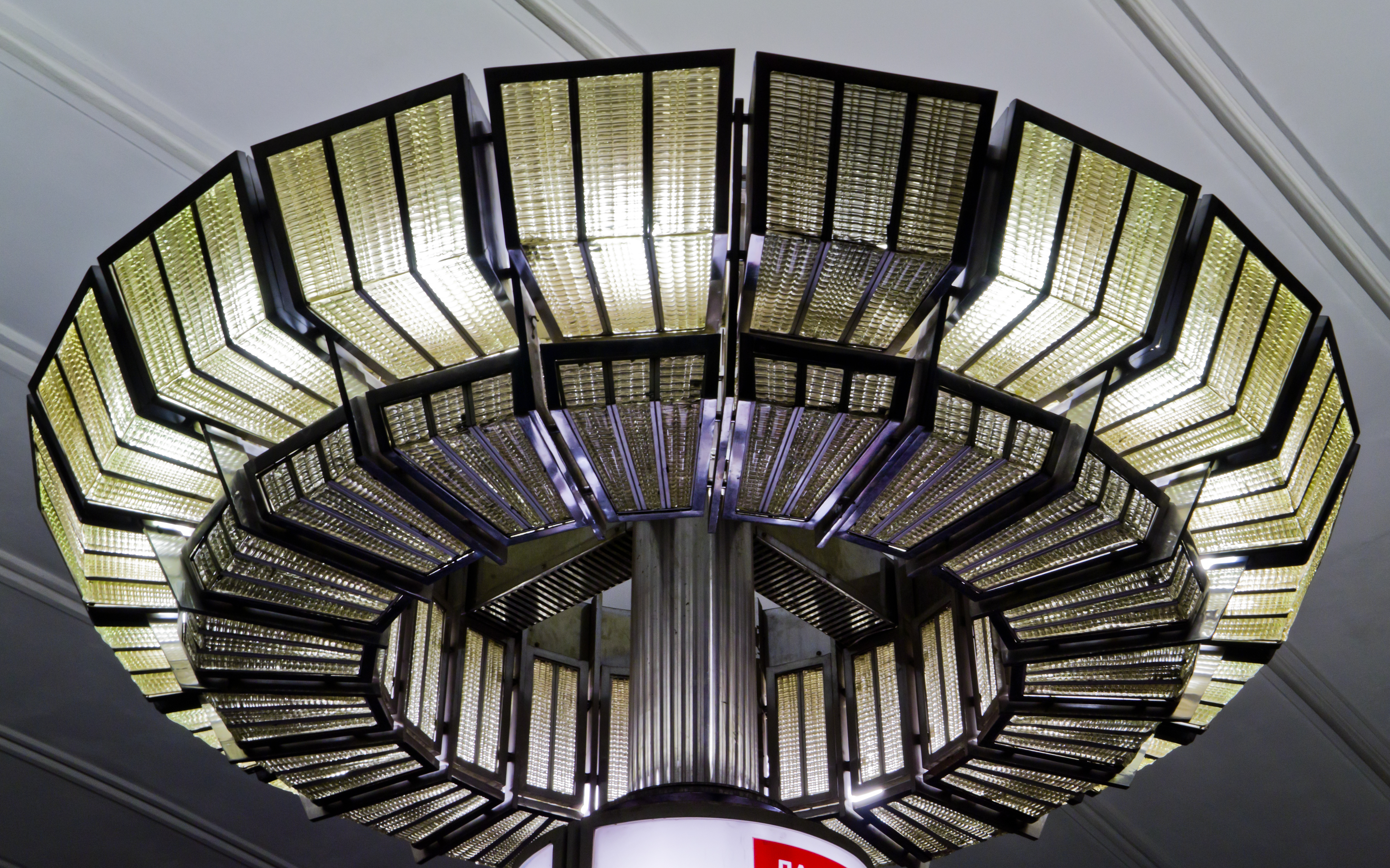

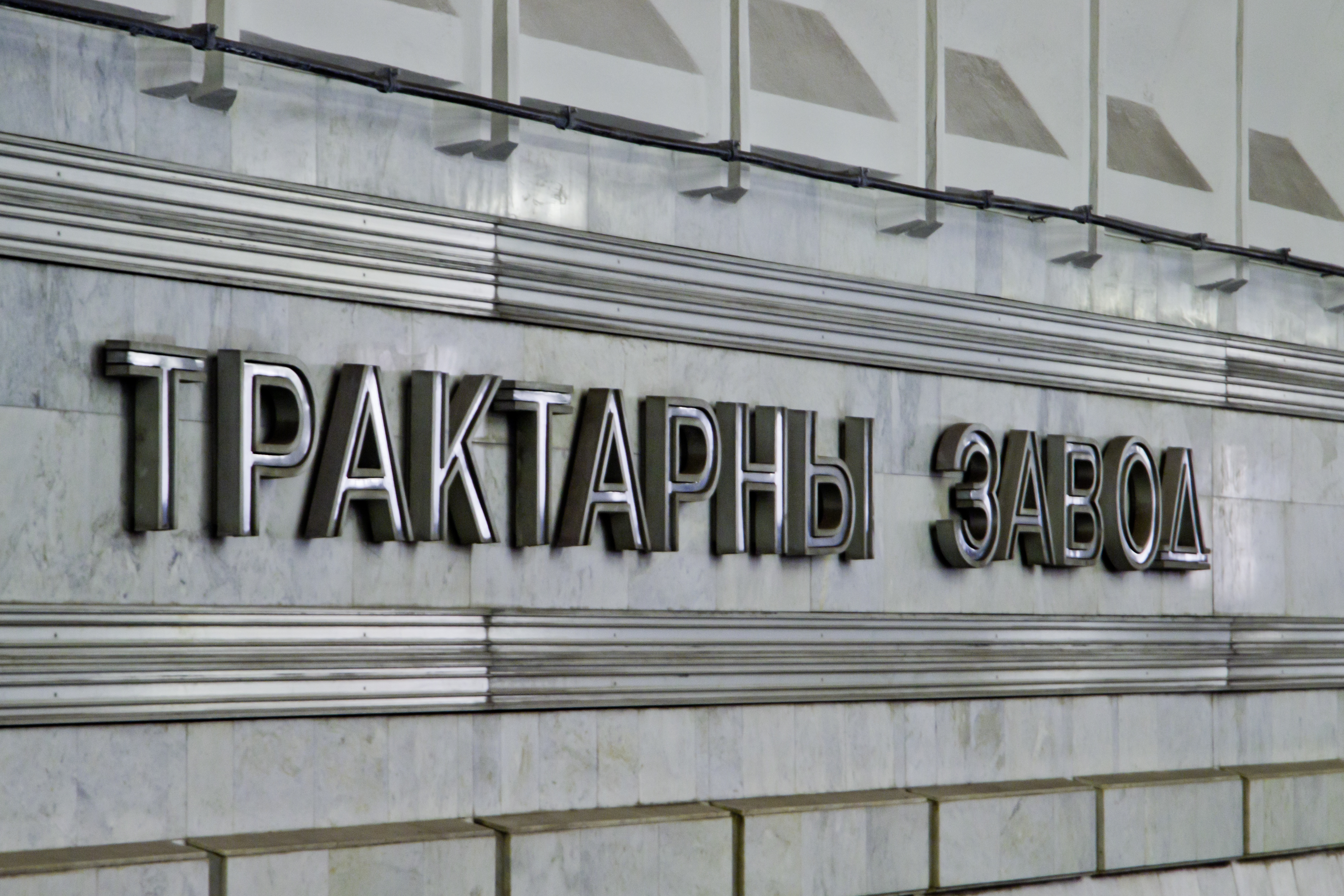
