= Pushkinskaya (Minsk Metro) =

Minsk Metro station

Pushkinskaya Пушкінская
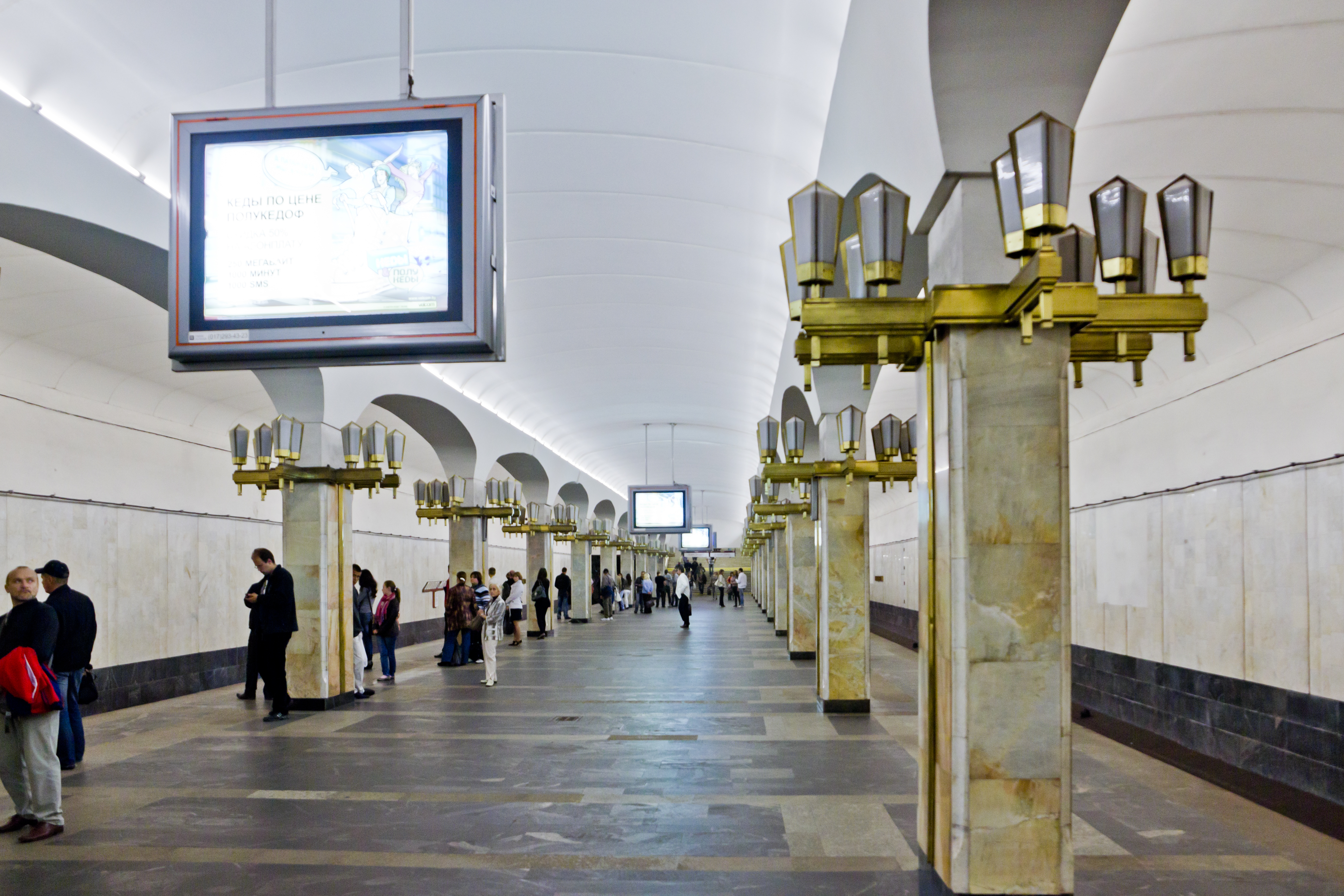
- Station Hall

General information
- Coordinates: 53°54′34″N 27°29′43″E
- System: Minsk Metro
- Owner: Minsk Metro
- Line: Awtazavodskaya line
- Platforms: Island platform
- Tracks: 2

Construction
- Structure type: Underground

Other information
- Station code: 220

History
- Opened: 3 July 1995; 31 years ago

Services
Preceding station	Minsk Metro	Following station
Spartywnaya towards Kamyennaya Horka	Awtazavodskaya line	Maladzyozhnaya towards Mahilyowskaya
Location
- Location within Belarus

Pushkinskaya (Belarusian: Пушкінская; Russian: Пушкинская; lit: "Pushkin station") is a Minsk Metro station. Opened on 3 July 1995.

== Gallery ==
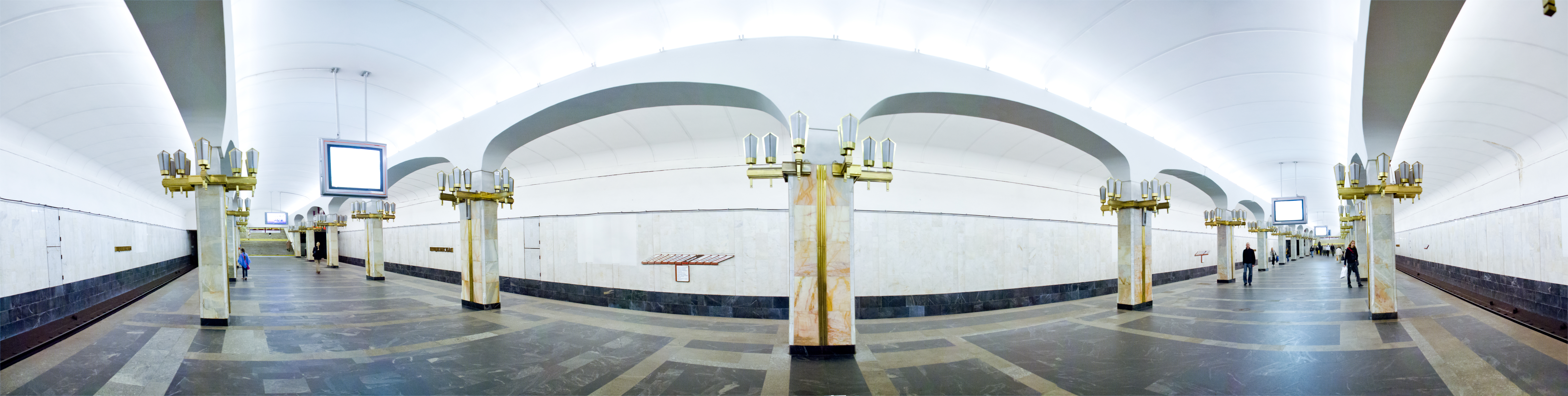

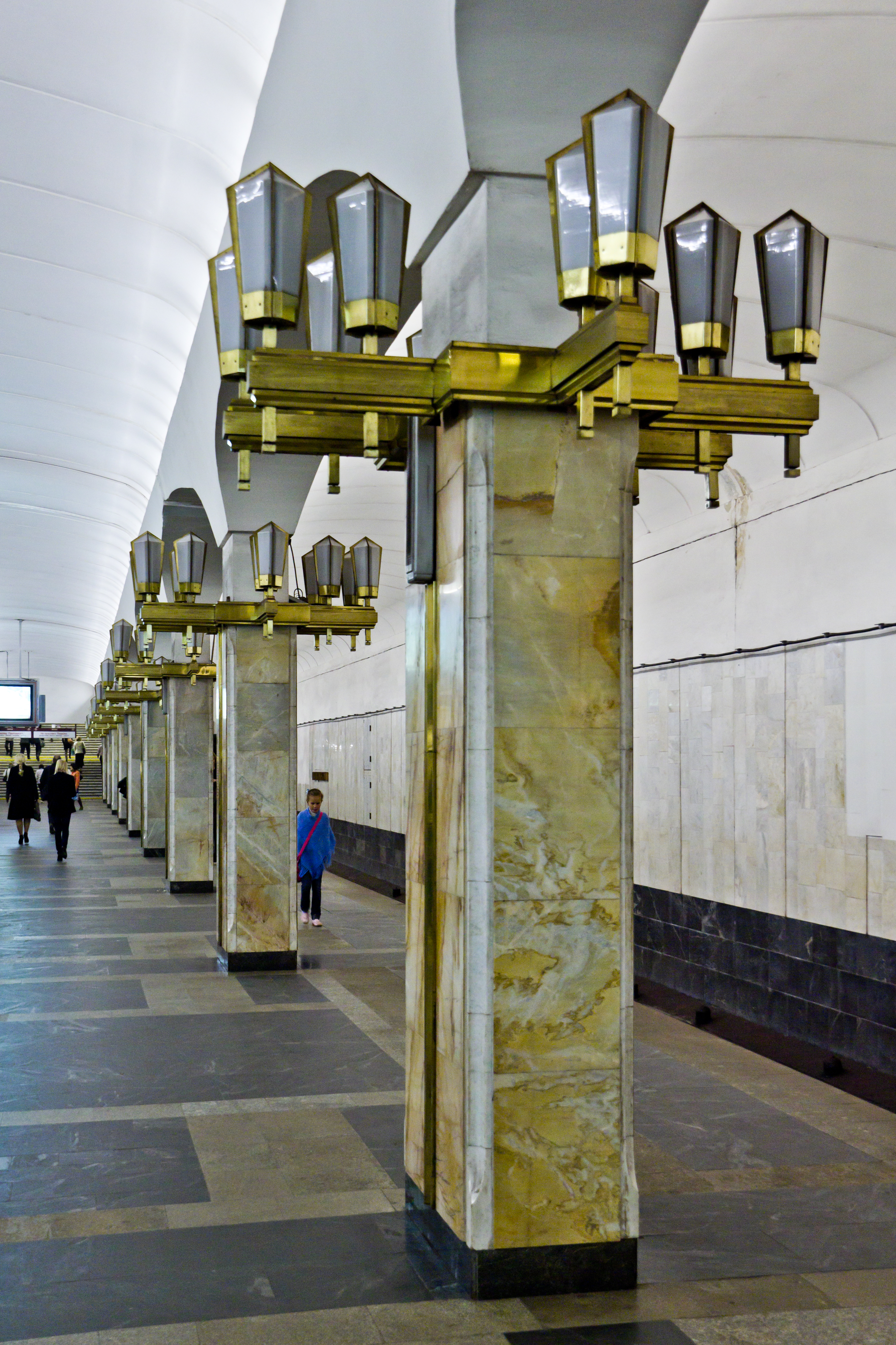

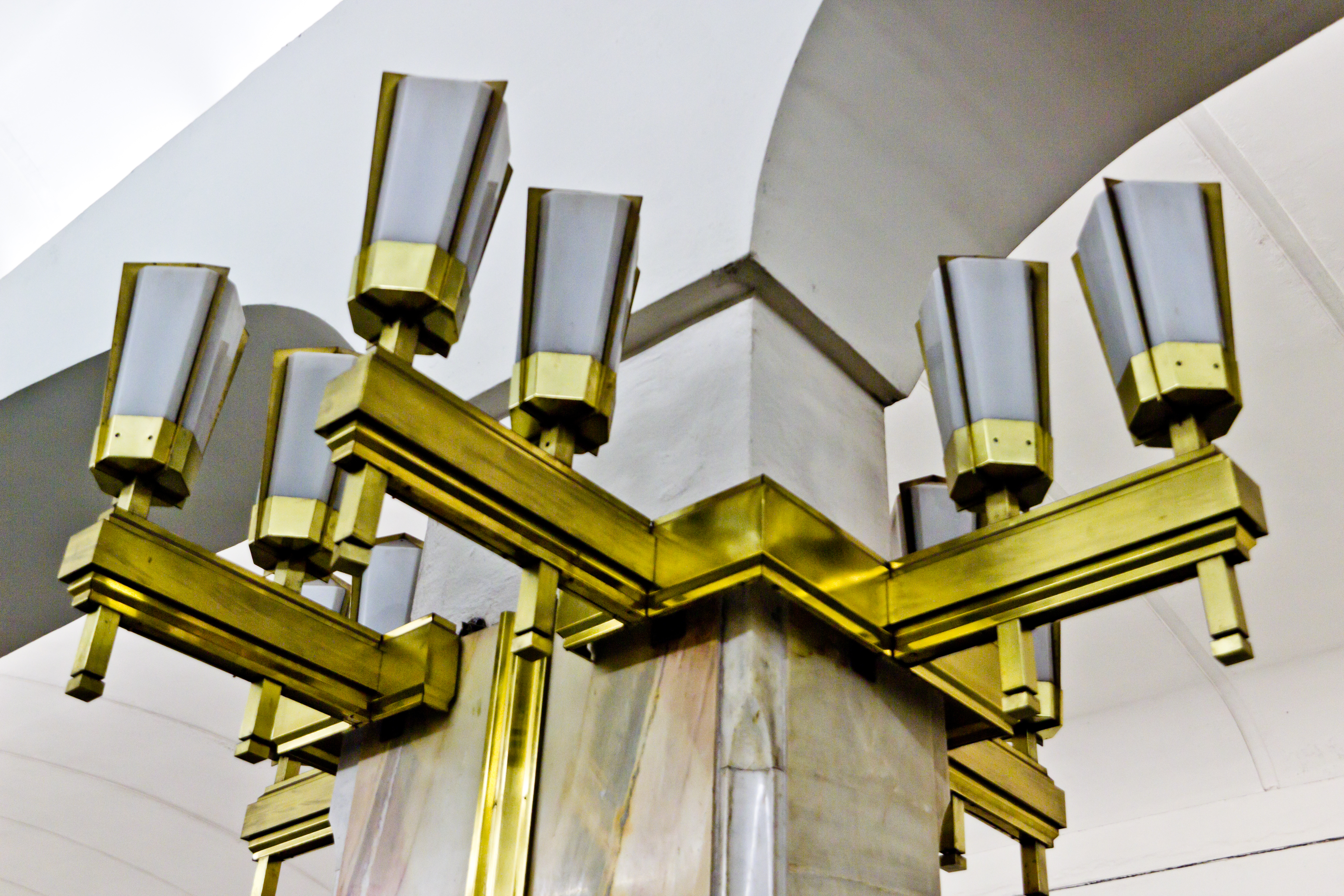

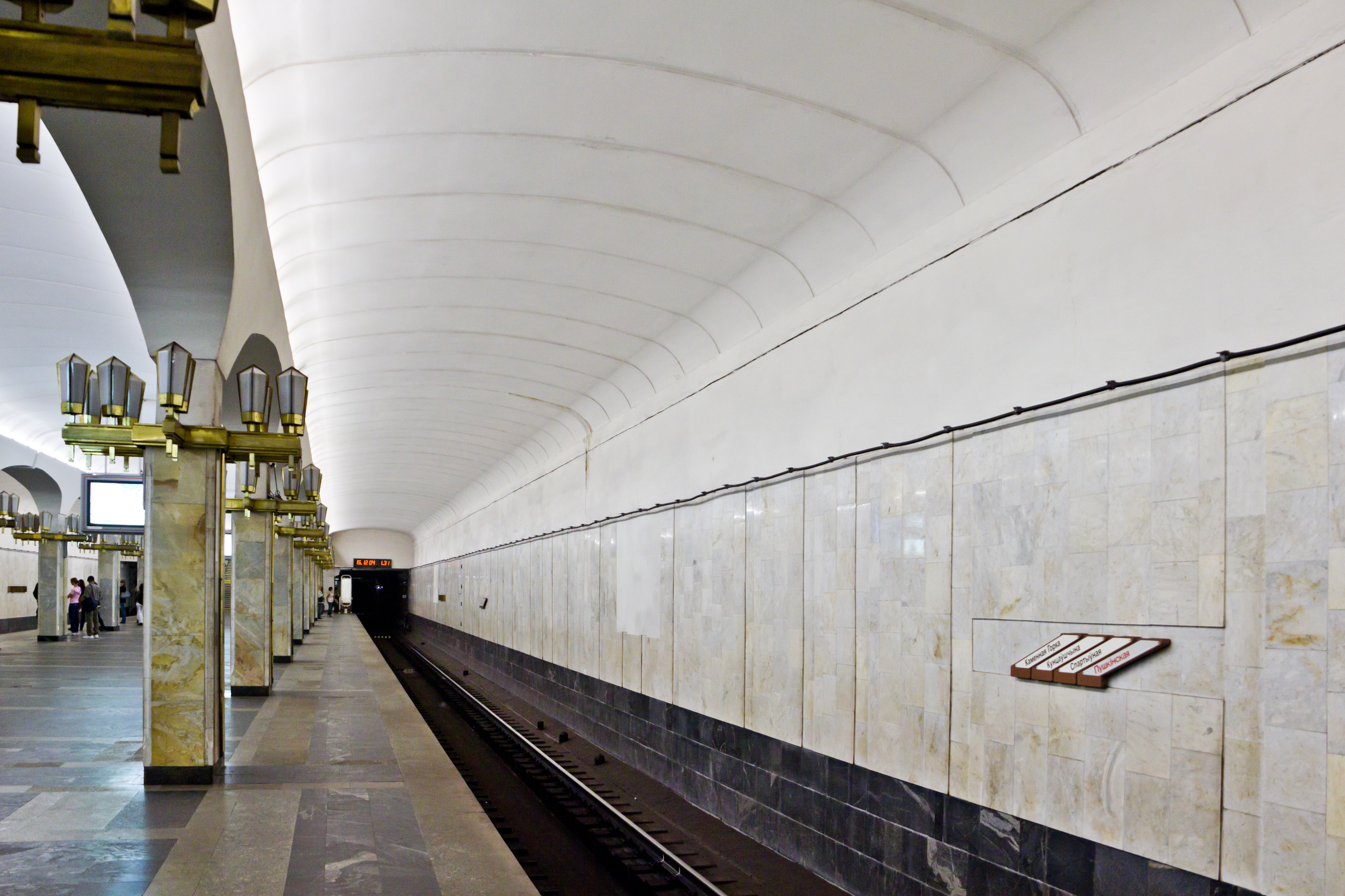

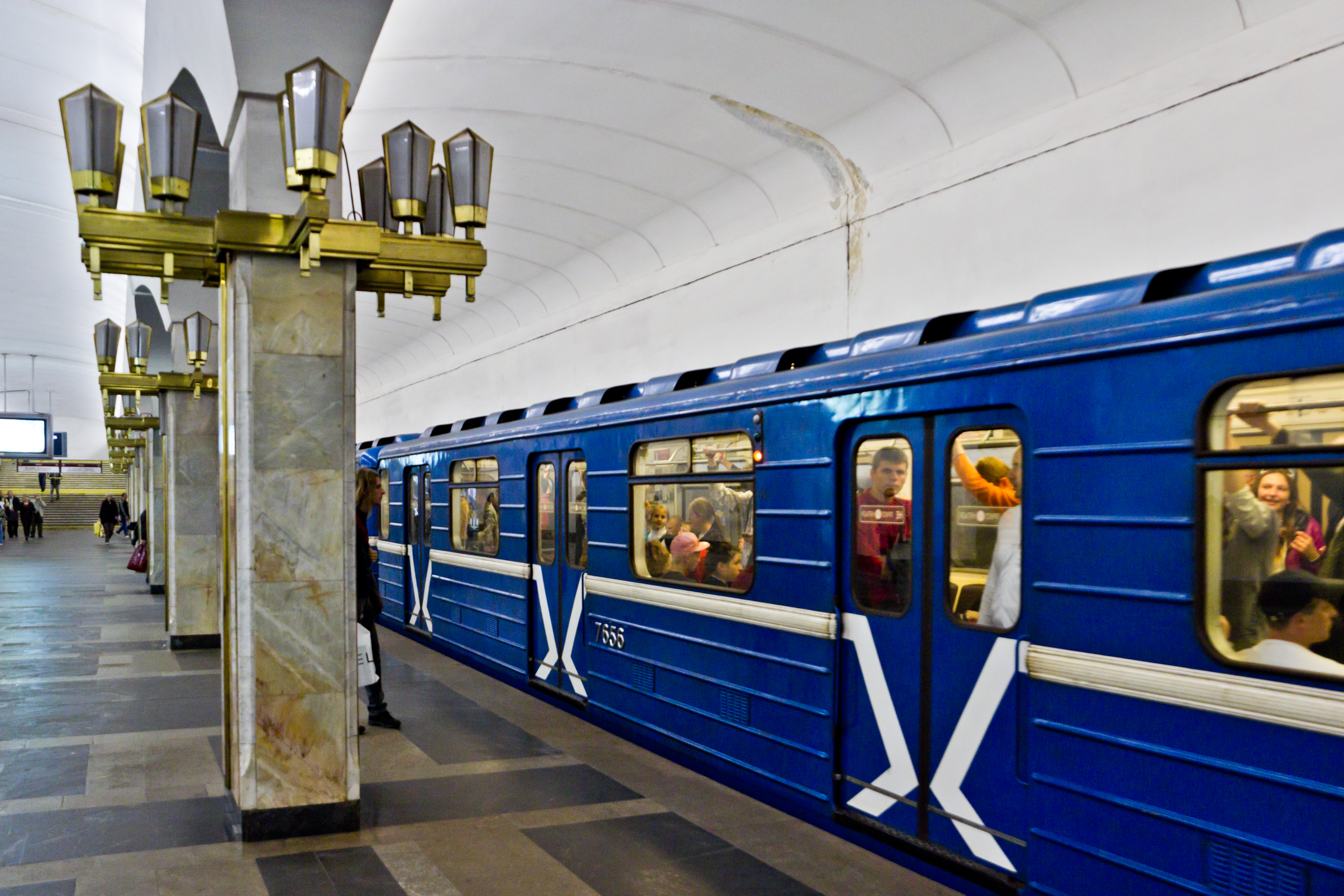
