= Awtazavodskaya line =

Minsk Metro line

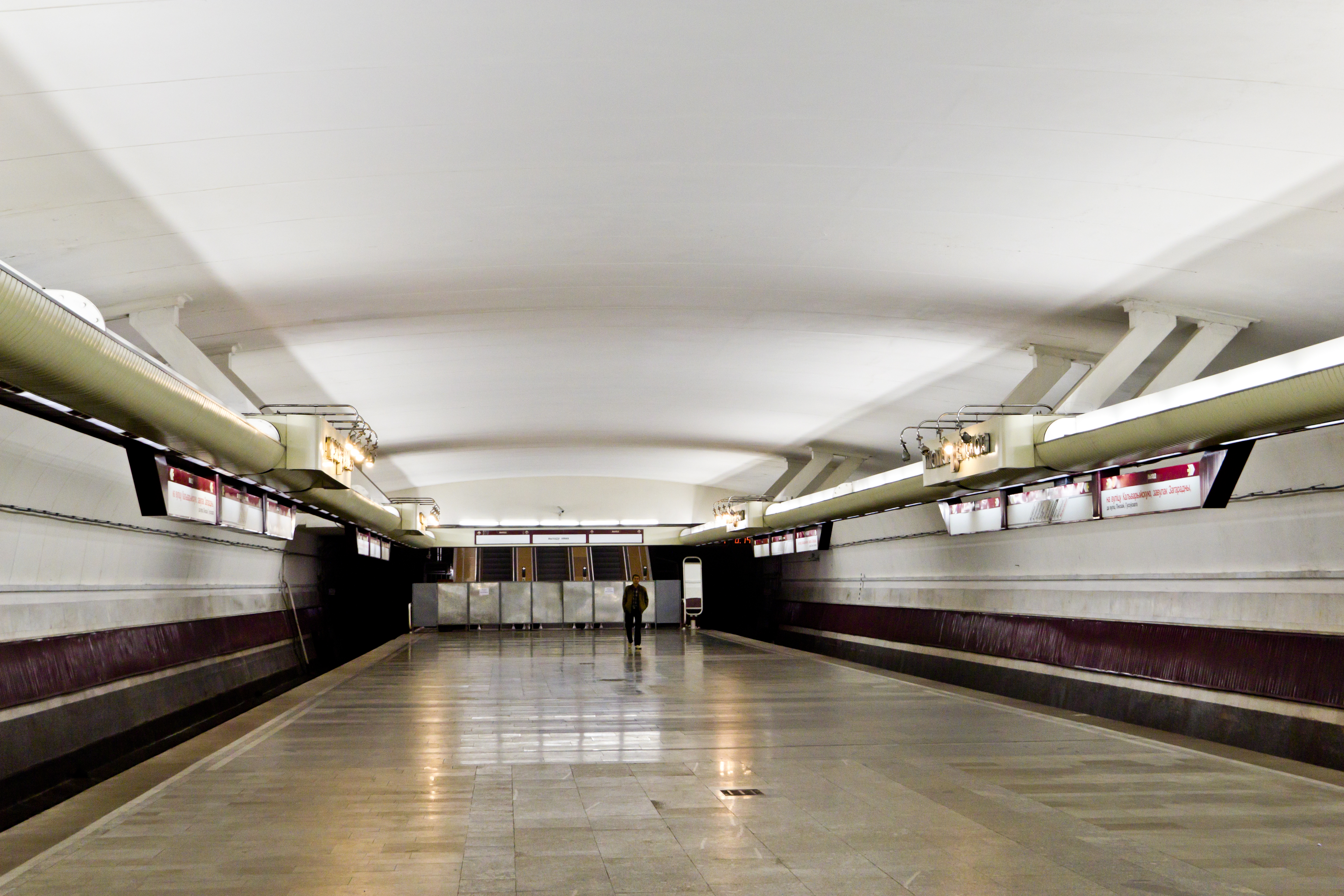
- Molodyozhnaya has a typical centre platform

Overview
- Status: Operational
- Owner: Minsk Metro
- Termini: Kamyennaya Horka; Mahilyowskaya
- Stations: 14

Service
- Type: Rapid transit
- System: Minsk Metro

History
- Opened: 1990

Technical
- Line length: 18.1 km (11.2 mi)
- Track gauge: 1,524 mm (5 ft)
Route map

The Awtazavodskaya line (Belarusian: Аўтазаводская лінія; Russian: Автозаводская линия) is a line of the Minsk Metro. The line opened in 1990 and crosses the city on a northwest–southeast axis. It comprises 14 stations.

== Timeline ==
Segment	Date opened
Traktarny zavod–Frunzyenskaya	December 31, 1990
Pyershamayskaya	1991
Frunzyenskaya–Pushkinskaya	July 3, 1995
Traktarny zavod–Awtazavodskaya	November 7, 1997
Awtazavodskaya–Mahilyowskaya	September 5, 2001
Pushkinskaya–Kamyennaya Horka	November 7, 2005

== Transfers ==
#	Transfer to	At
1	Maskowskaya line	Kupalawskaya
3	Zelenaluzhskaya line	Frunzyenskaya

== Rolling stock ==
The line is served by the Mogilyovskoe depot (№ 2), and currently has 29 five carriage 81-717/714 and the modernised 81-717.5M/714.5M trains assigned to it.
