= Kamyennaya Horka =

Minsk Metro station

Kamyennaya Horka Каме́нная горка
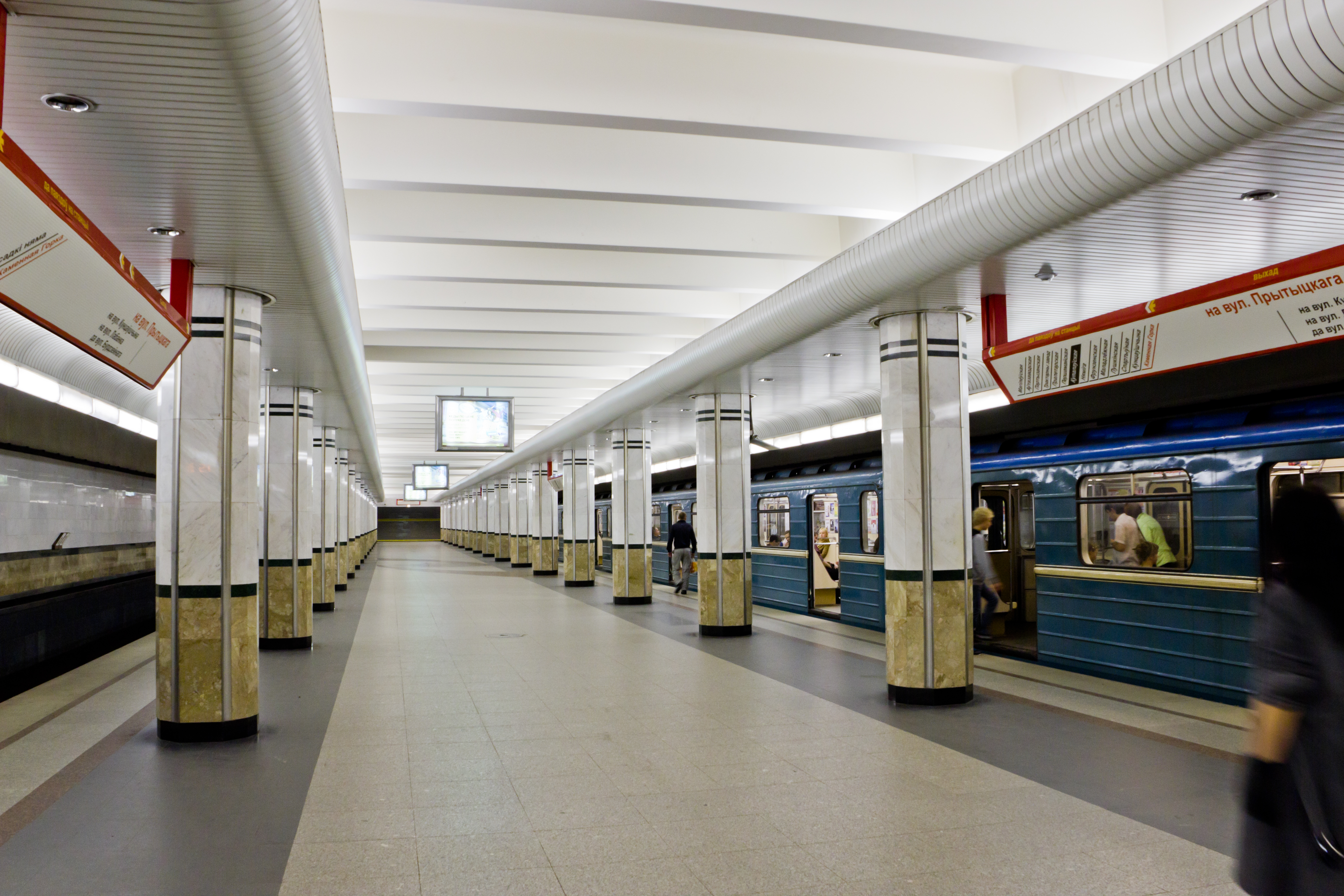
- Platform Hall

General information
- Coordinates: 53°54′25″N 27°26′7″E
- System: Minsk Metro
- Owner: Minsk Metro
- Line: Awtazavodskaya line
- Platforms: 1 Island platform
- Tracks: 2

Construction
- Structure type: Underground

Other information
- Station code: 223

History
- Opened: 7 November 2005; 20 years ago

Services
Preceding station	Minsk Metro	Following station
Terminus	Awtazavodskaya line	Kuntsawshchyna towards Mahilyowskaya
Location
- Location within Belarus

Kamyennaya Horka (Belarusian: Каме́нная горка/Kamiennaja Horka; Russian: Каменная горка) is a Minsk Metro station. Opened on 7 November 2005.

== History ==
Construction of the station began on 5 June 2001. Originally planned for opening in September 2005, it was postponed to 7 November 2005 as part of the opening of the fifth section of the line.

== Gallery ==
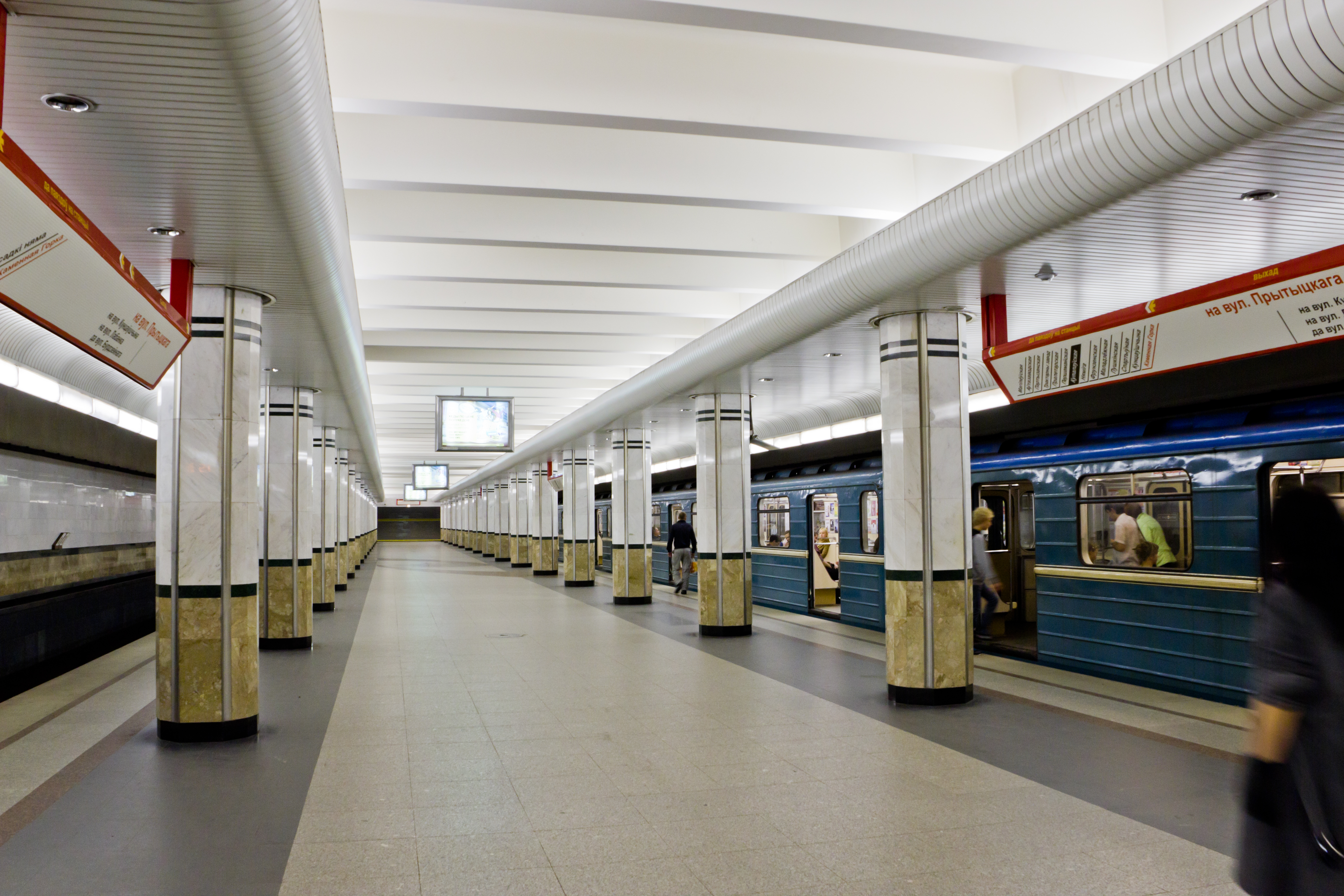
Platforms (2011)

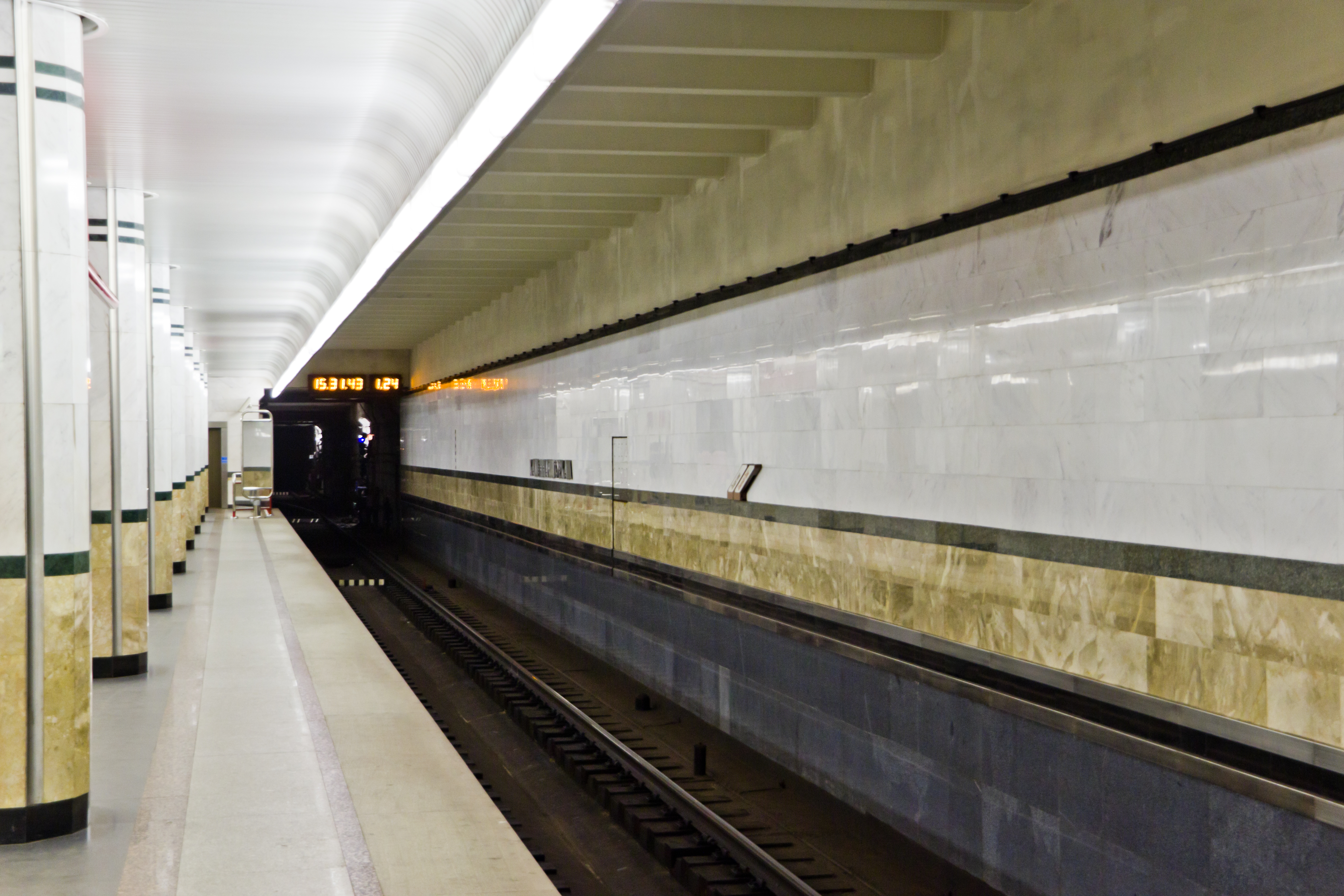

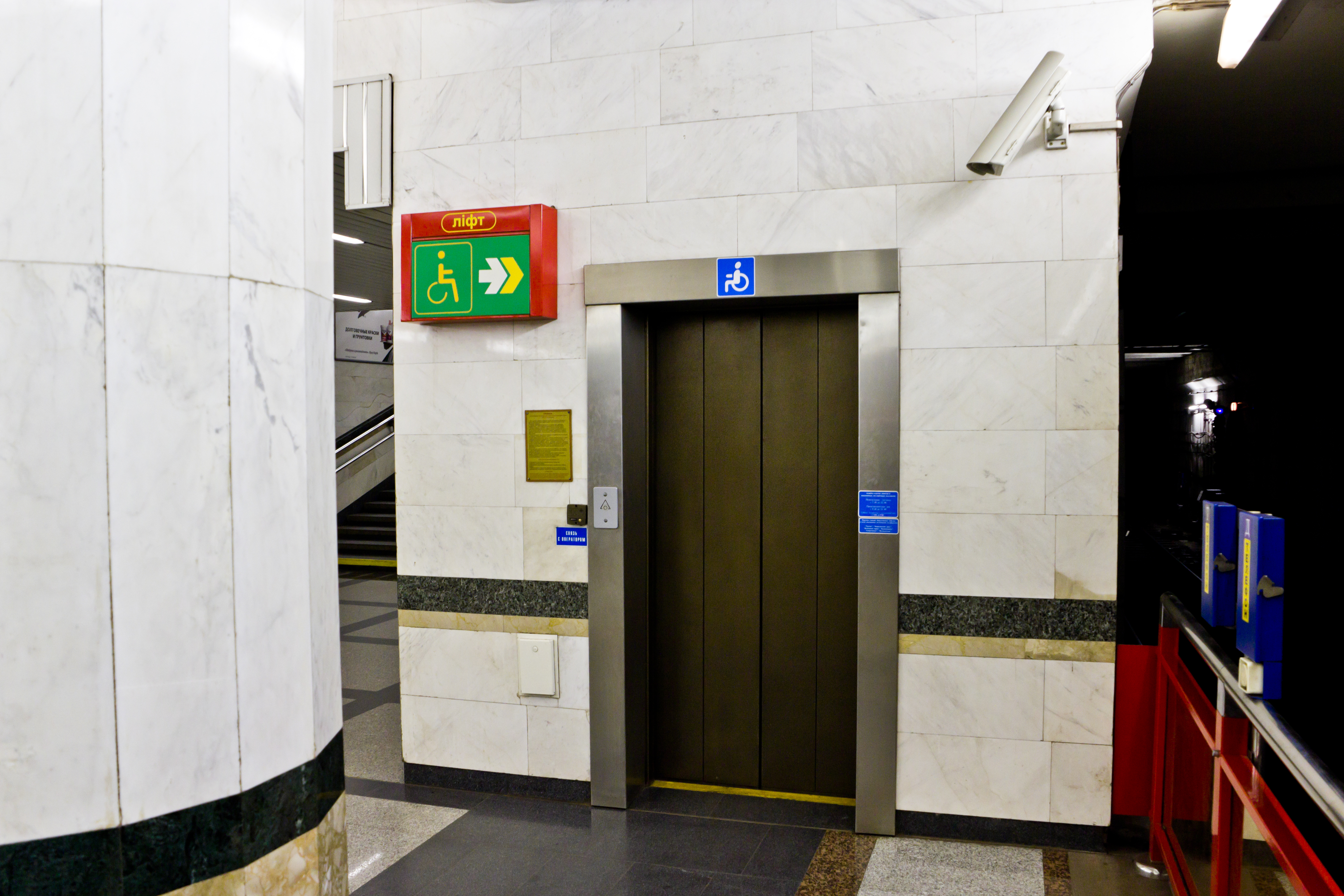
Elevator on the platform level

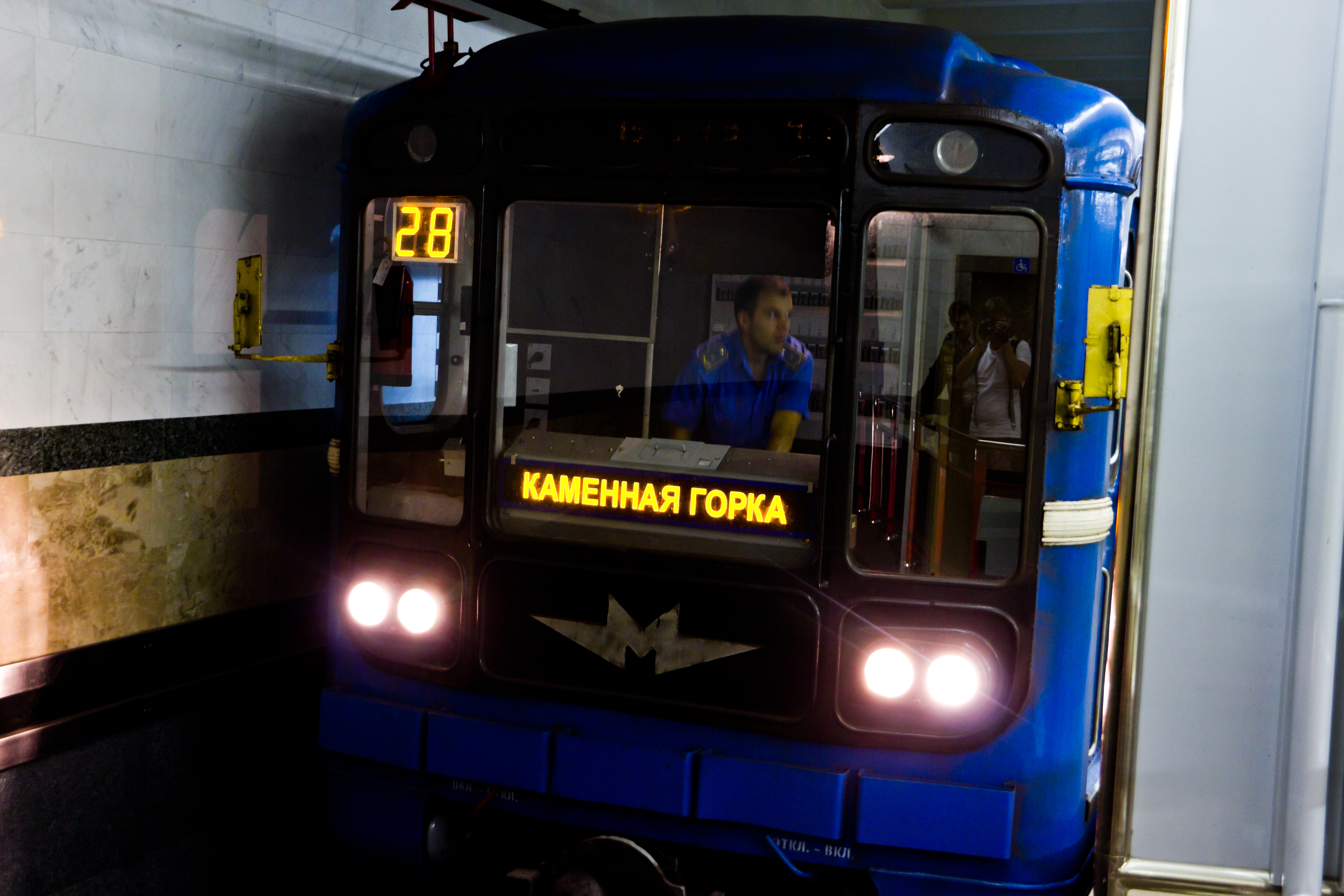
