= Nyamiha =

Subterranean river in Minsk

Coordinates: 53°54′24″N 27°33′17″E

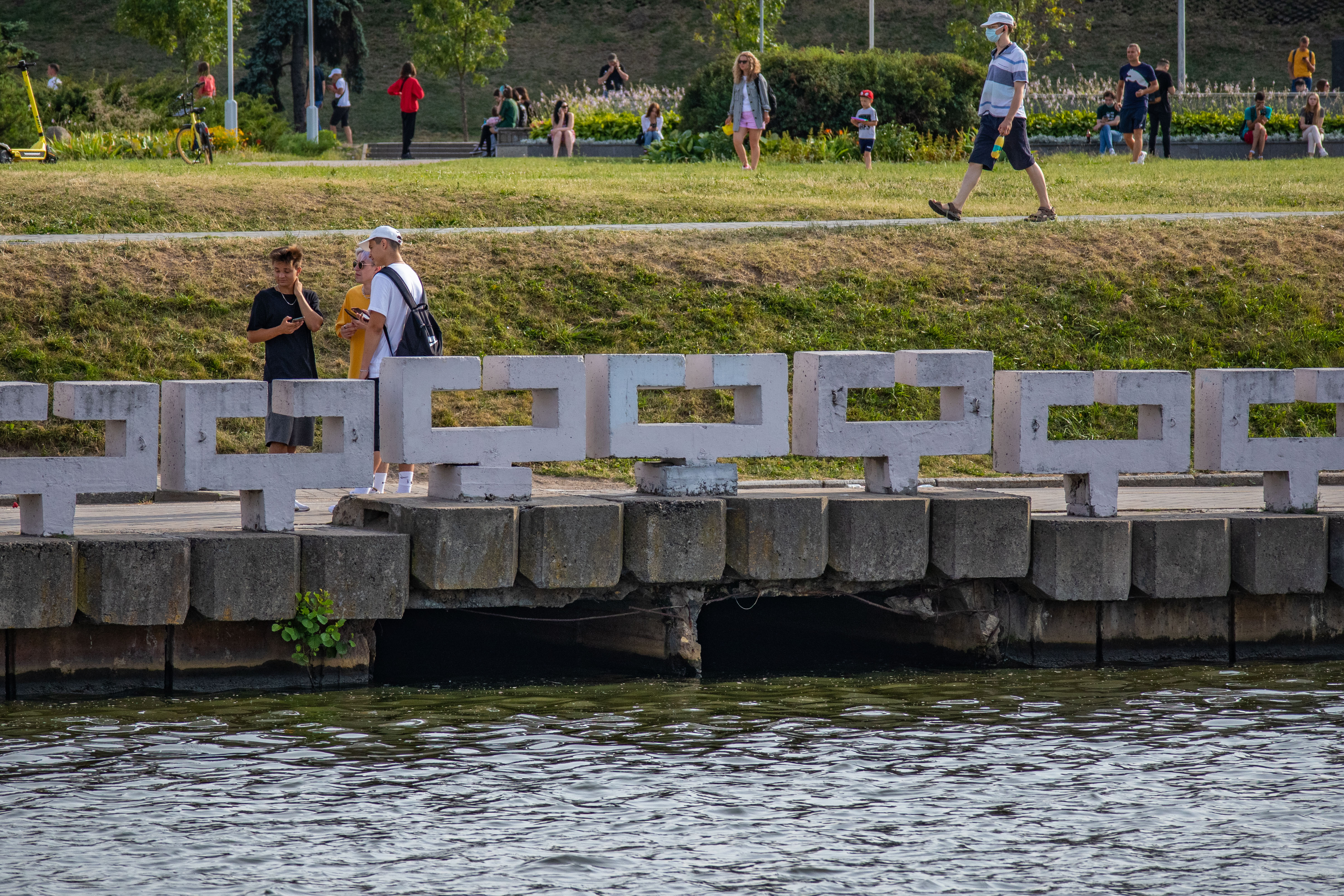
Underground pipes with Niamiha flowing into the Svislach

The Nyamiha or Nemiga (Belarusian: Няміга, [nʲaˈmʲiɣa]; Russian: Немига, [nʲɪˈmʲiɡə]) is a river in Minsk. Today it is contained within a fabricated culvert. It discharges into the Svislach.

The first mention of the river in historical chronicles is connected with the disastrous Battle on the Nemiga River, which took place on the riverbank in 1067 when the forces of the prince of Kievan Rus' defeated the forces of Polatsk princedom. The medieval epic The Tale of Igor's Campaign refers to the "bloody river banks of Nyamiha," with lines that detail the battle:

On the Nemiga the spread sheaves are heads,
the flails that threshare of steel,
lives are laid out on the threshing floor,

souls are winnowed from bodies.
Nemiga’s gory banks are not sowed
goodly-sown with the bones of Russia’s sons.

For a long time, it was the second largest river flowing through Minsk, until it was adapted for its urban location by containment within a network of pipes. One part of the river was put into a pipe in 1926, and the rest in 1955. Today, the river is a minor feature of the city environment, and the name Nyamiha more commonly refers to the street above.

Notably, in the Lithuanian language, "Nemiga" is interpreted to mean "the river that does not sleep."

Niamiha Street is part of a shopping district famous for its amber craftwork. The Nyamiha metro station on the street was the site of a human stampede on May 30, 1999.

Another incident on Nyamiha Street occurred on July 25, 2004, when a two-hour downpour in Minsk caused the storm sewers to overflow. Nyamiha Street and its environs were flooded.
