= Cold Synagogue =

Cold Synagogue (Yiddish: די קאַלטע שול, Belarusian: Халодная сінагога (Chalodnaja sinagoga)) can refer to several historical synagogues in Belarus:

- Cold Synagogue, Minsk
- Cold Synagogue, Mogilev
- Cold Synagogue, Slutsk
