= Mikhailovsky Square =

Belarusian Park

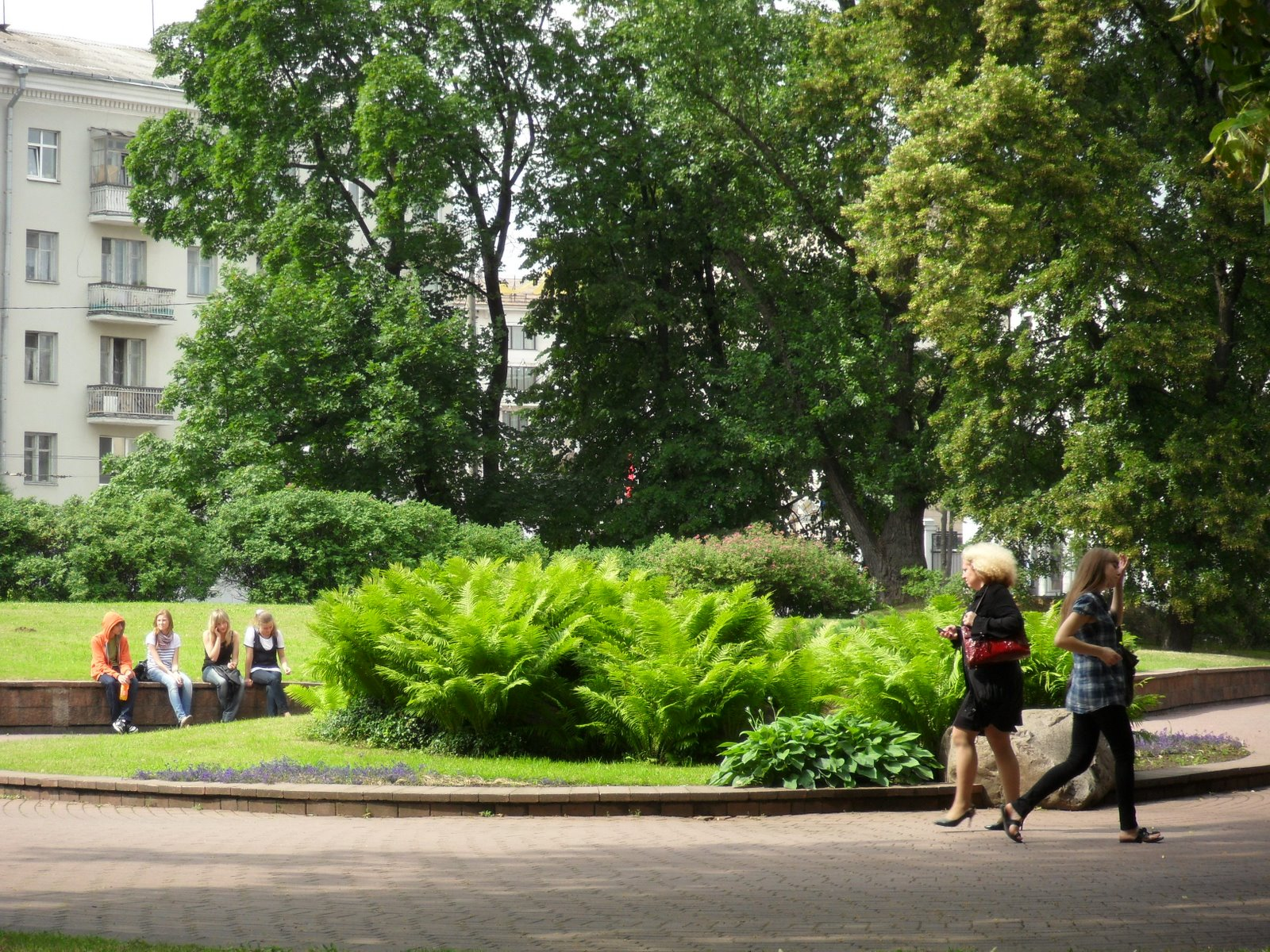
- Location: Minsk, Belarus
- Coordinates: 53.894451°N 27.551724°E
- Opened: 1925

Mikhailovsky Square (Belarusian Mihajlauski Square) is a public garden in Minsk, Belarus. It is located between Leningradskaya, Sverdlov, Kirov streets and Mikhailovsky lane on the territory of the Oktyabrsky district of Minsk, near the borders of the Moscow and Leninsky districts.

== History ==
The square near the Vilensky Market was founded in 1925. In 1934, it was renamed into Mikhailovsky Square. In 1998, it was reopened after reconstruction.

== Sightseeing ==
The park is famous for the sculptural groups, such as "Girl with an Umbrella" (in memory of the tragedy of May 30, 1999), "Stranger", "Smoker" by sculptor Vladimir Zhbanov.
