= Niamiha Street =

Street in Minsk, Belarus

Niamiha street
- Nemiga street
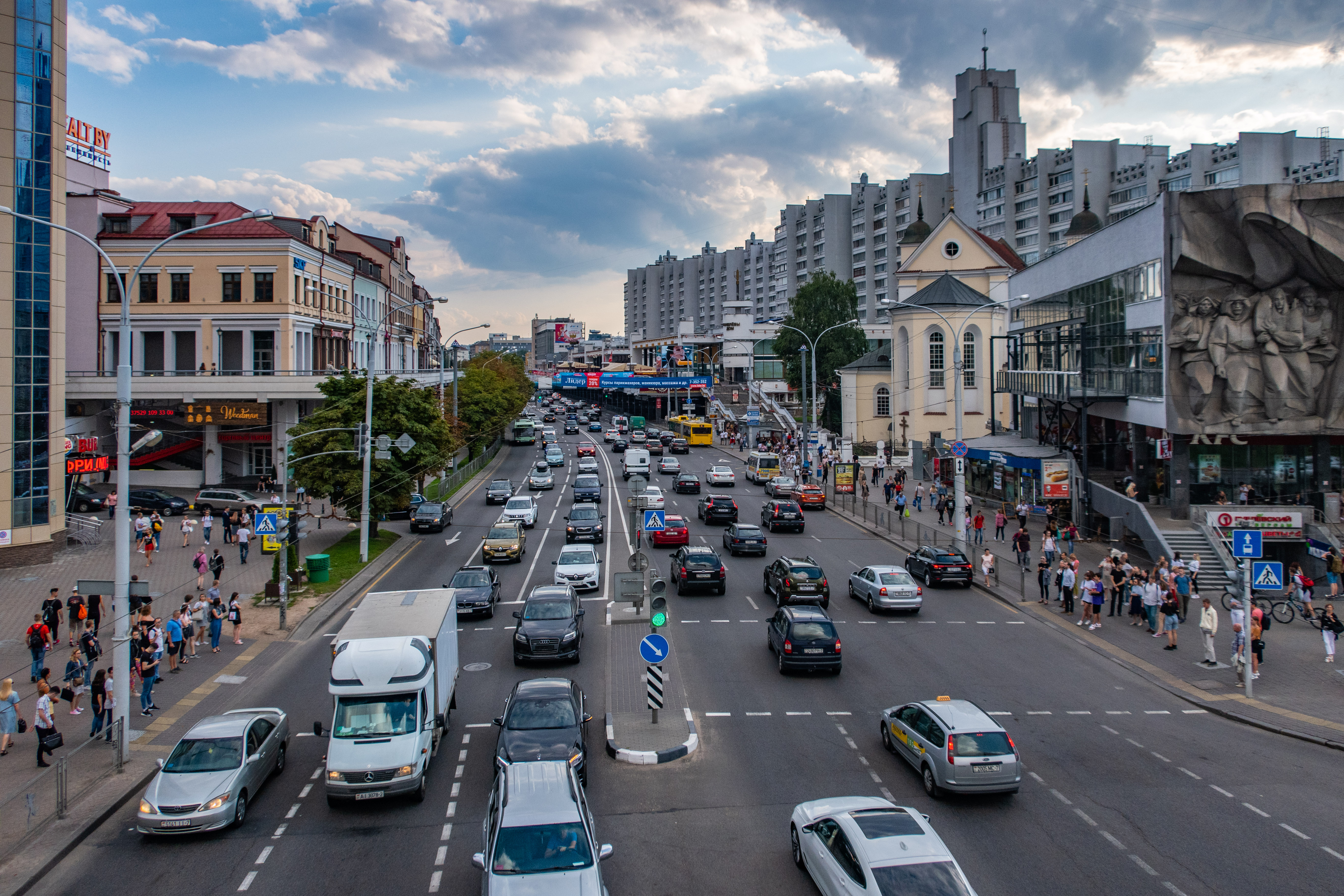
- View of the street

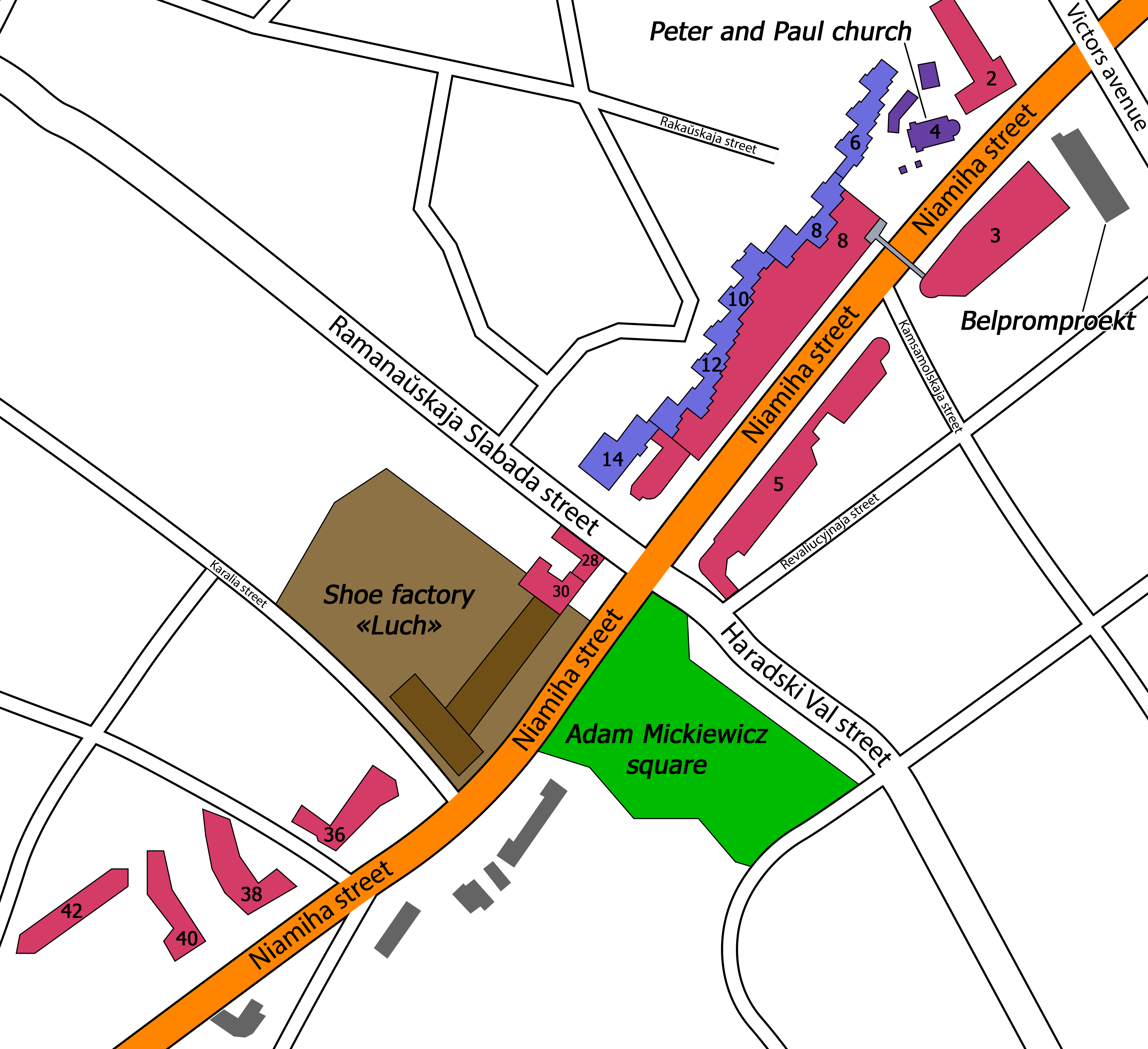
- Native name: вуліца Няміга (Belarusian)
- Former name: Nemigskaya street
- Type: street
- Length: 1.8 km (1.1 mi)
- Location: Maskowski District, Tsentralny District

Niamiha Street (also Nyamiha, Nemiga; Belarusian: Вуліца Няміга; Russian: Улица Немига) is a street named after the eponymous river in central Minsk, Belarus. From the 1960s to the 2010s, the street was completely reconstructed losing all but one original building on it.

== History and architecture ==
The street along the river of the same name appeared in the 12th century near the Minsk castle. It is considered to be one of the oldest streets in Minsk. In 16th–18th centuries, it was named Nemigskaya. It became the main street of the Lower market district and a major shopping street. From the beginning of the 17th century this narrow street started to be built up with 2 and 3-storey baroque and classicist buildings. Due to geographical features of the terrain the river used to flood often. In the late 19th century the river was deepened and covered with a wooden flooring, which formed the street's pavement. In 1924, the construction of an underground culvert to remove the river from the street started. During the Second World War, the street was part of the Minsk Ghetto. The majority of the street's buildings survived the war.

In the 1960s, a major reconstruction of the street started and all historical buildings were soon demolished except for Peter and Paul church. In 1967, a modernist Belpromproekt building was erected, and a nearby Cold Synagogue was demolished. After finishing the Belpromproekt building, Soviet architects decided to reconstruct the whole street in a way inspired by the New Arbat Avenue in Moscow. One of the reasons to build a completely new broad street was the insufficient throughput of the Independence Avenue. The architects proposed to split vehicle and pedestrian streams by creating a two-level street: car-oriented ground level and above-ground pedestrian level. A major trade center was projected to be built on the street. In a 1972 project, a long residential building with a shopping mall was to be built on the northwestern (even) side, and several towers up to 16 floors on the southeastern (odd) side. The construction started in 1975, but it went slowly, and only the first stage of the project (Musinsky's House residential building and part of the Na Nemige shopping mall) was constructed by the late 1980s, while the second wasn't even started. During Perestroika, in 1987–1988, a major discussion in the "Construction and architecture of Belarus" magazine was held between the chief architect Sergey Musinsky and defenders of the architectural heritage. In 1988, an architectural competition for the southeastern side took place, but the winning project wasn't embodied. In 2005 and 2008, the projects which merged the modernist ideas of a two-level street with the calls to preserve the heritage were approved. A 5-storey line of buildings imitating the style of 19th and early 20th centuries was to be built on the odd side of the street. One of the architects Gennady Dulevich stated that the restoration of the old structures was impossible but also called to take the historical appearance of original buildings into account. The construction ended by 2014.

Reconstructed Niamiha was criticized for interfering with long-established architecture and ruining some of the city's old buildings. It was also noted that a 400-meter long building ruined the established planning of the city, cutting the Rakaŭskaje pradmiescie from the city center. The buildings on the odd side of the street were criticized as pseudo-historical and having some ulterior motives.

== Transport ==
The street has two stations of the Minsk Metro: Nyamiha (1990) and Plošča Franciška Bahuševiča (2020). The street has stops of many buses and trolleybuses.

== Gallery ==
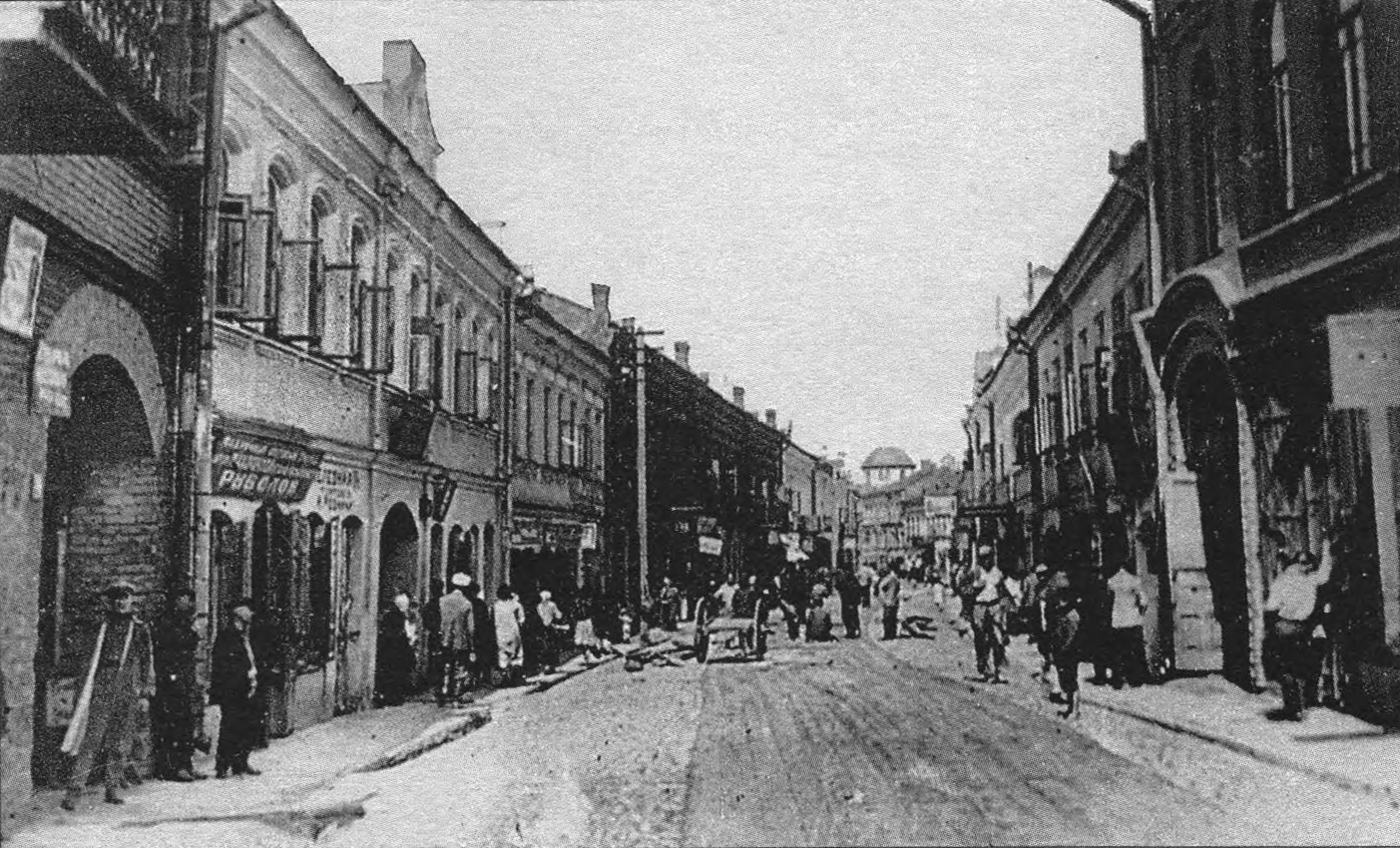
Street in 1923

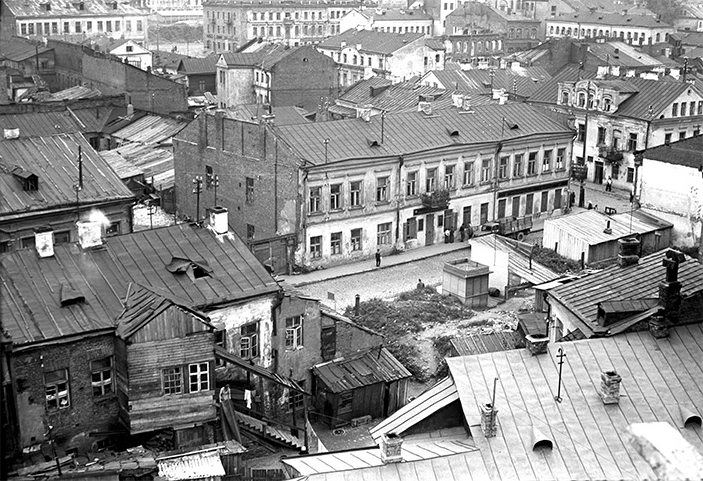
Street in the late 1940s

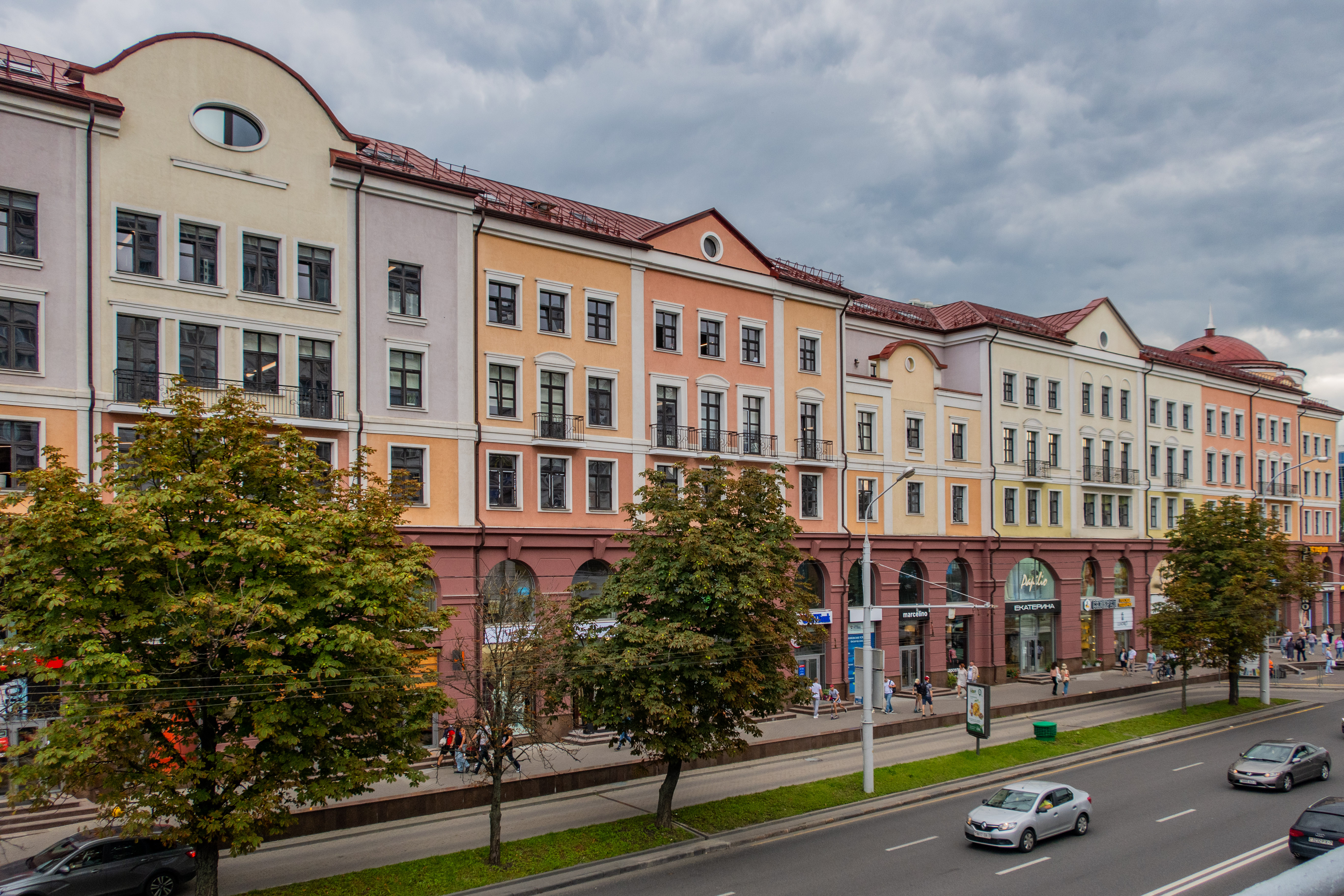
Pseudohistorical buildings (2000s) on the odd side

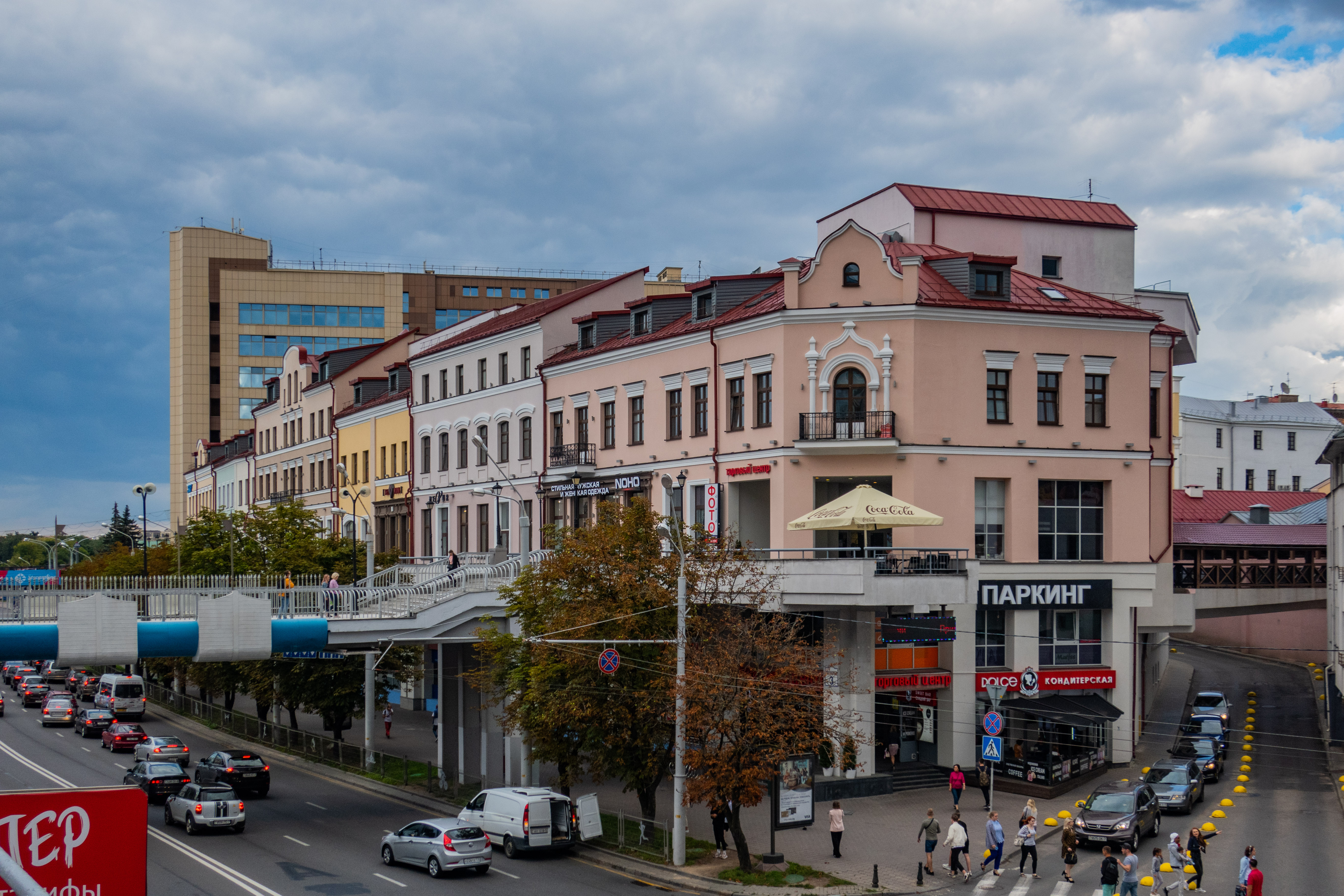
Pseudohistorical buildings (2000s) on the odd side. Note the pedestrian bridge on the left

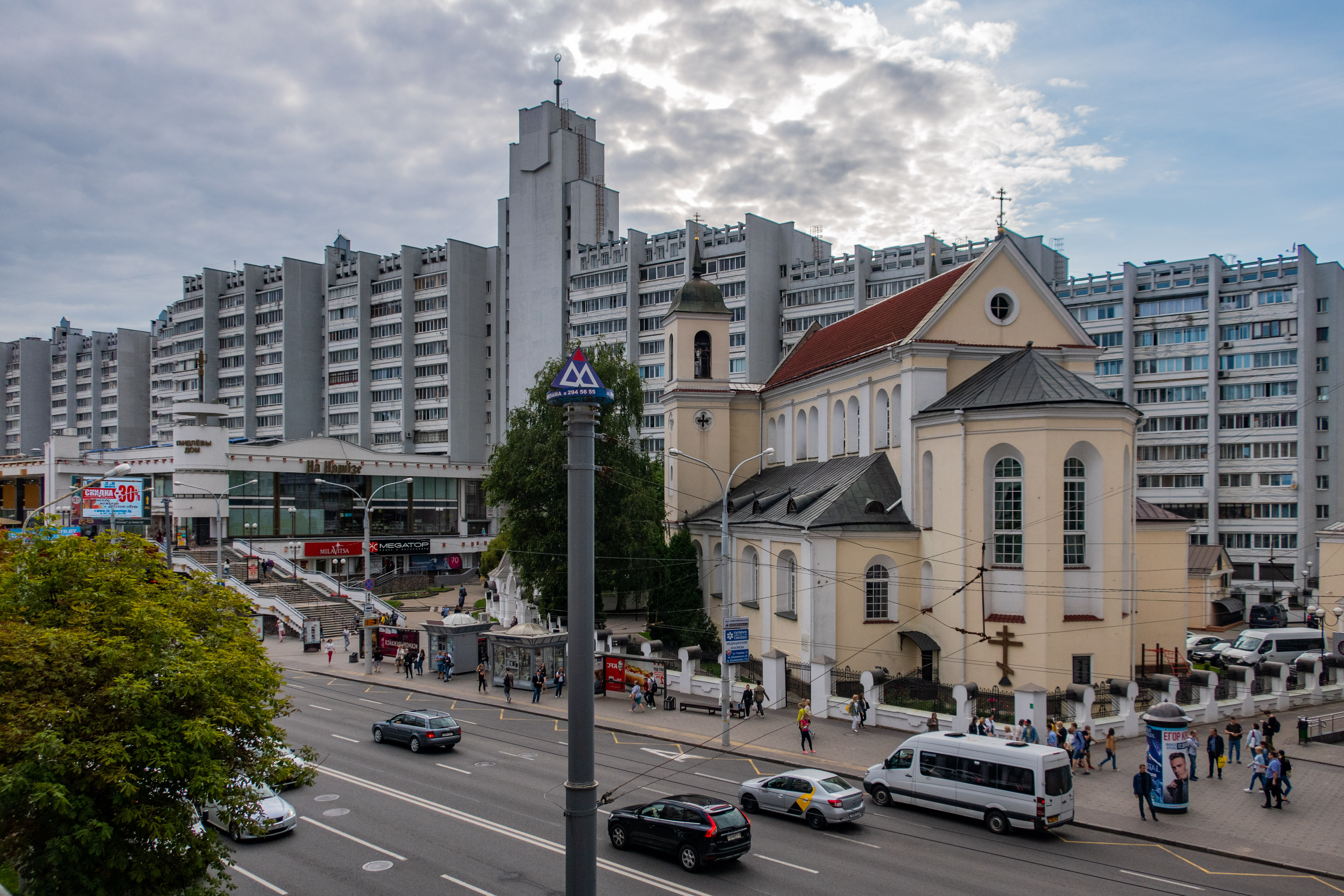
Na Nemige shopping mall (1980s–1990s), Musinsky's house (with a spire, 1970s–1980s), Peter and Paul church (1620s) on the even side

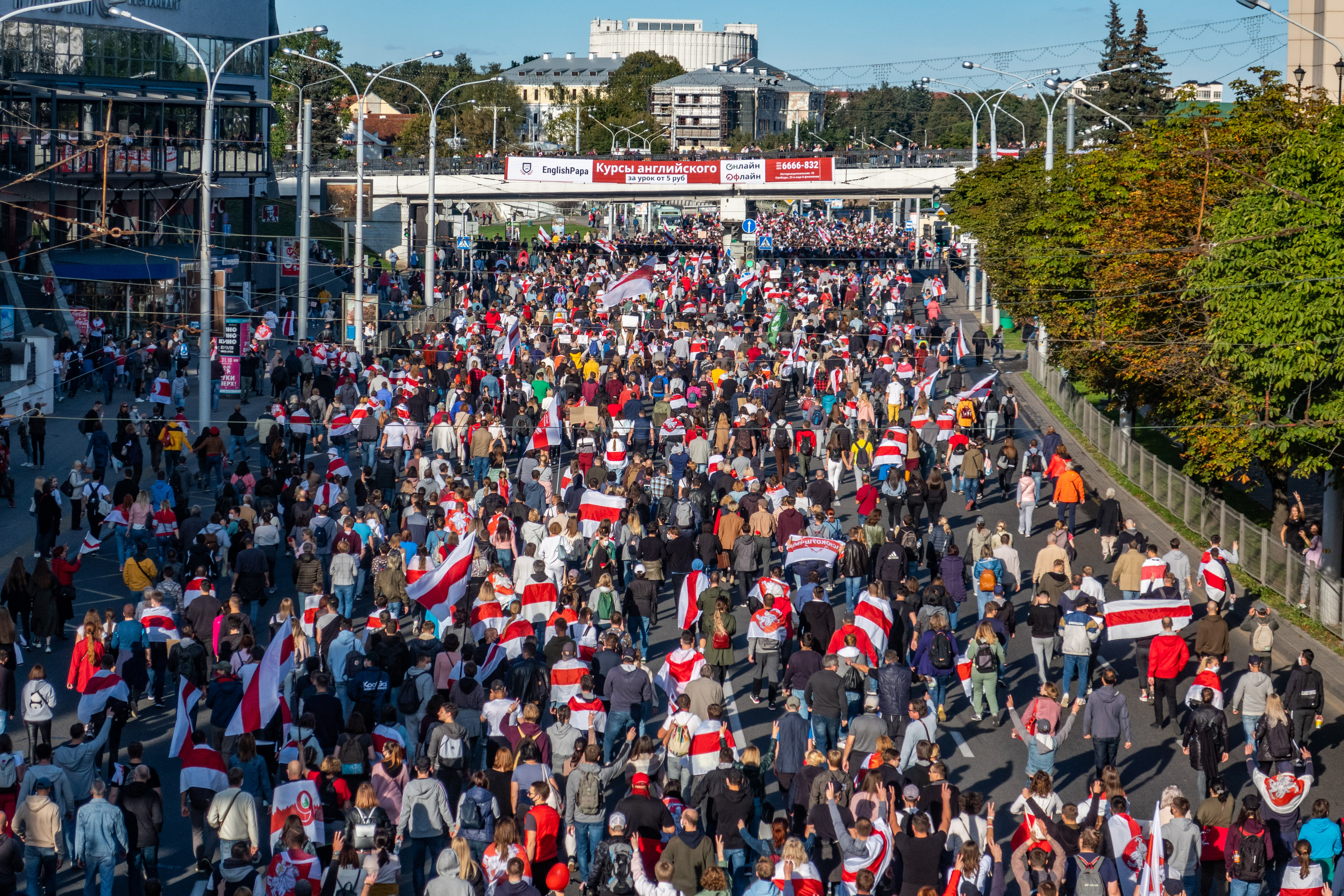
Anti-Lukashenko protesters on the street, 2020

== Sources ==
- Минск: энциклопедический справочник. Минск, 1983 [Minsk: encyclopedic reference. Minsk, 1983]. P. 286–287.
