= Nyamiha (Minsk Metro) =

Minsk Metro station

Nyamiha Няміга
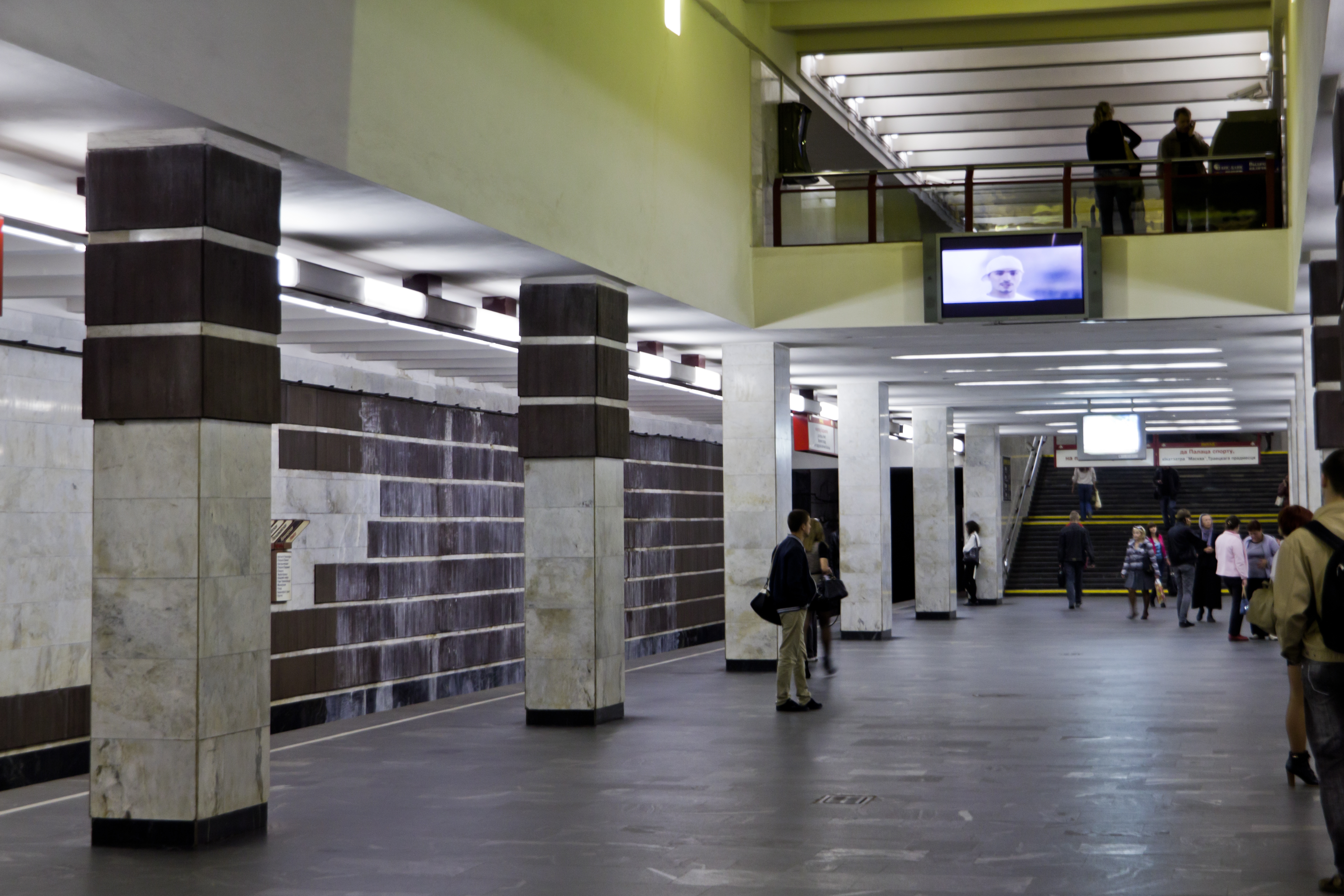
- Няміга (Niamiha)

General information
- Coordinates: 53°54′21″N 27°33′14″E
- System: Minsk Metro
- Owner: Minsk Metro
- Platforms: 1 island platform
- Tracks: 2

Construction
- Structure type: Underground

Other information
- Station code: 217

History
- Opened: 31 December 1990; 35 years ago

Services
Preceding station	Minsk Metro	Following station
Frunzyenskaya towards Kamyennaya Horka	Awtazavodskaya line	Kupalawskaya towards Mahilyowskaya
Location
- Location within Belarus

Nyamiha (Belarusian: Няміга) is a Minsk Metro station. The station opened on December 31, 1990.

It is located by the Nyamiha Street, both being named after the Niamiha River. In 1999, it was the site of the Nyamiha stampede, in which 53 people were crushed to death.

== Gallery ==
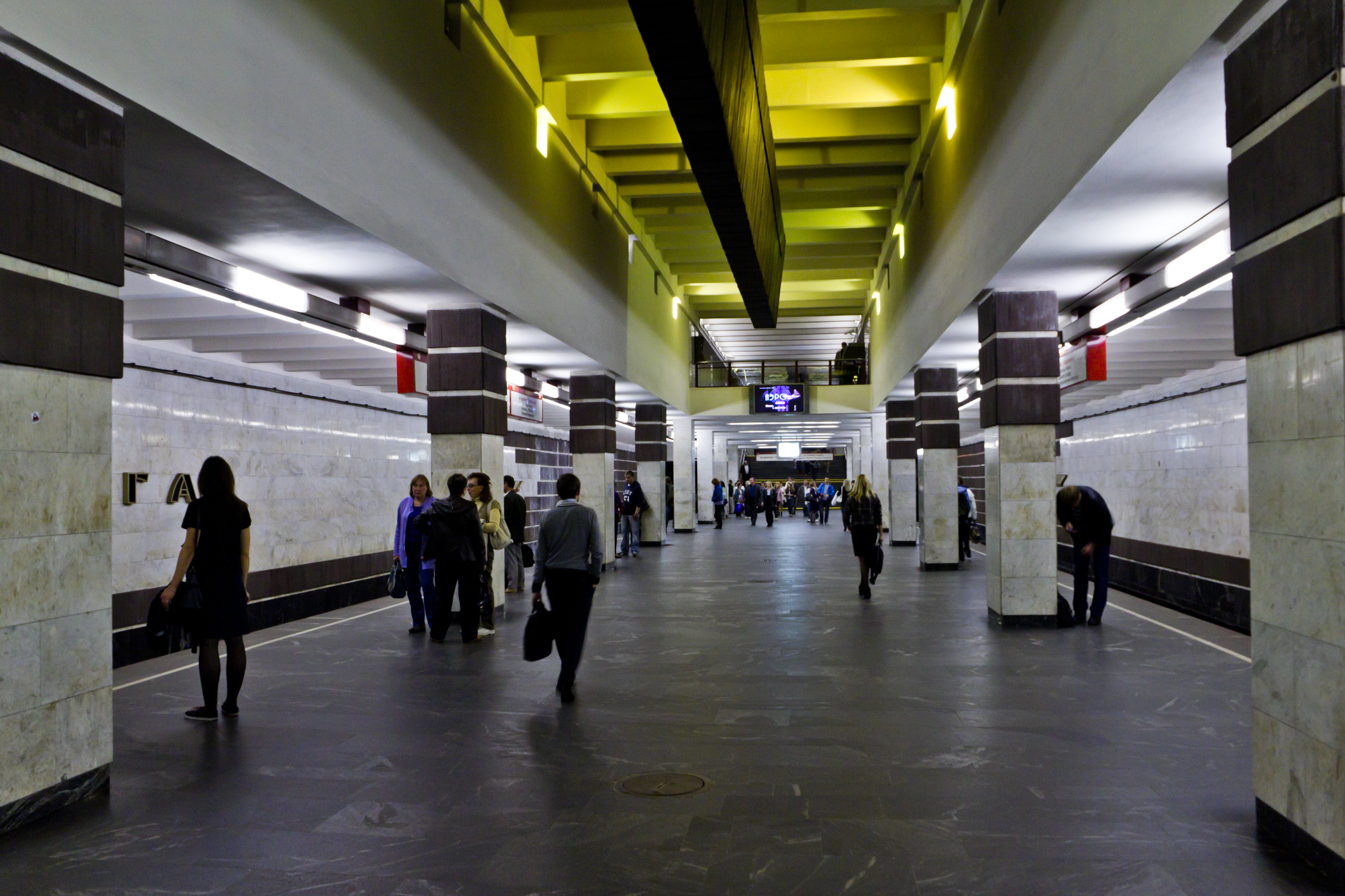

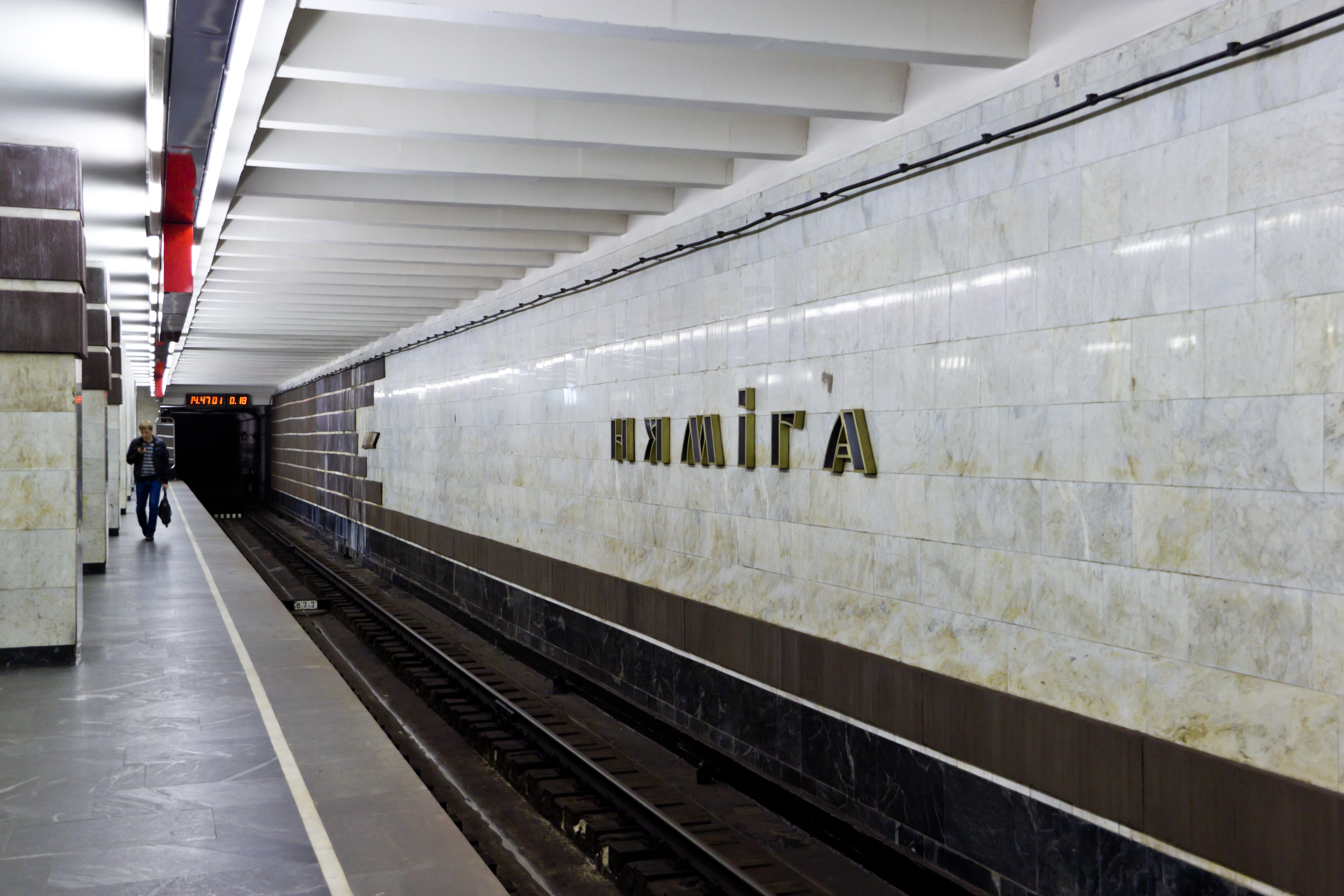

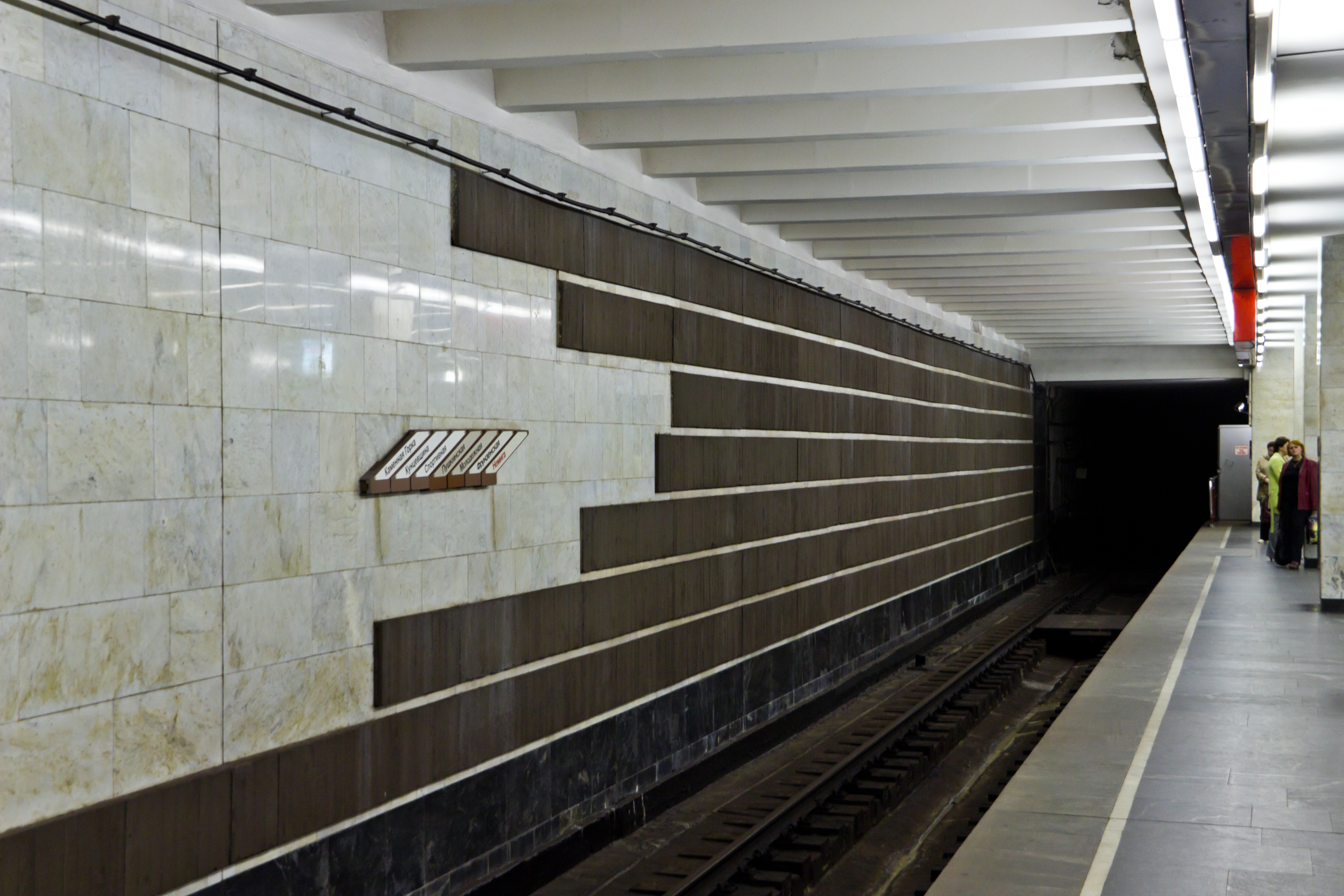
The name of the station on the wall of the platform hall.

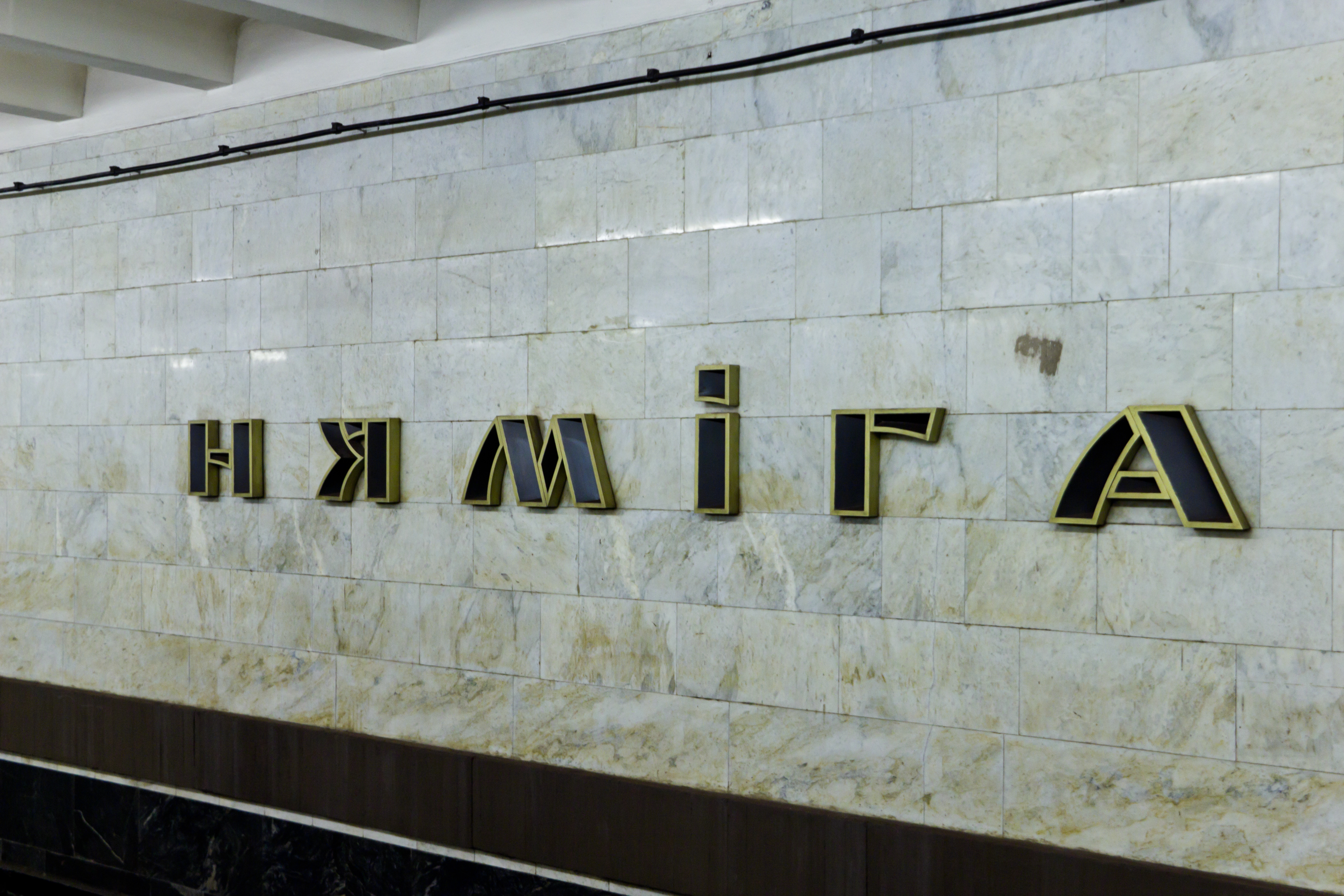

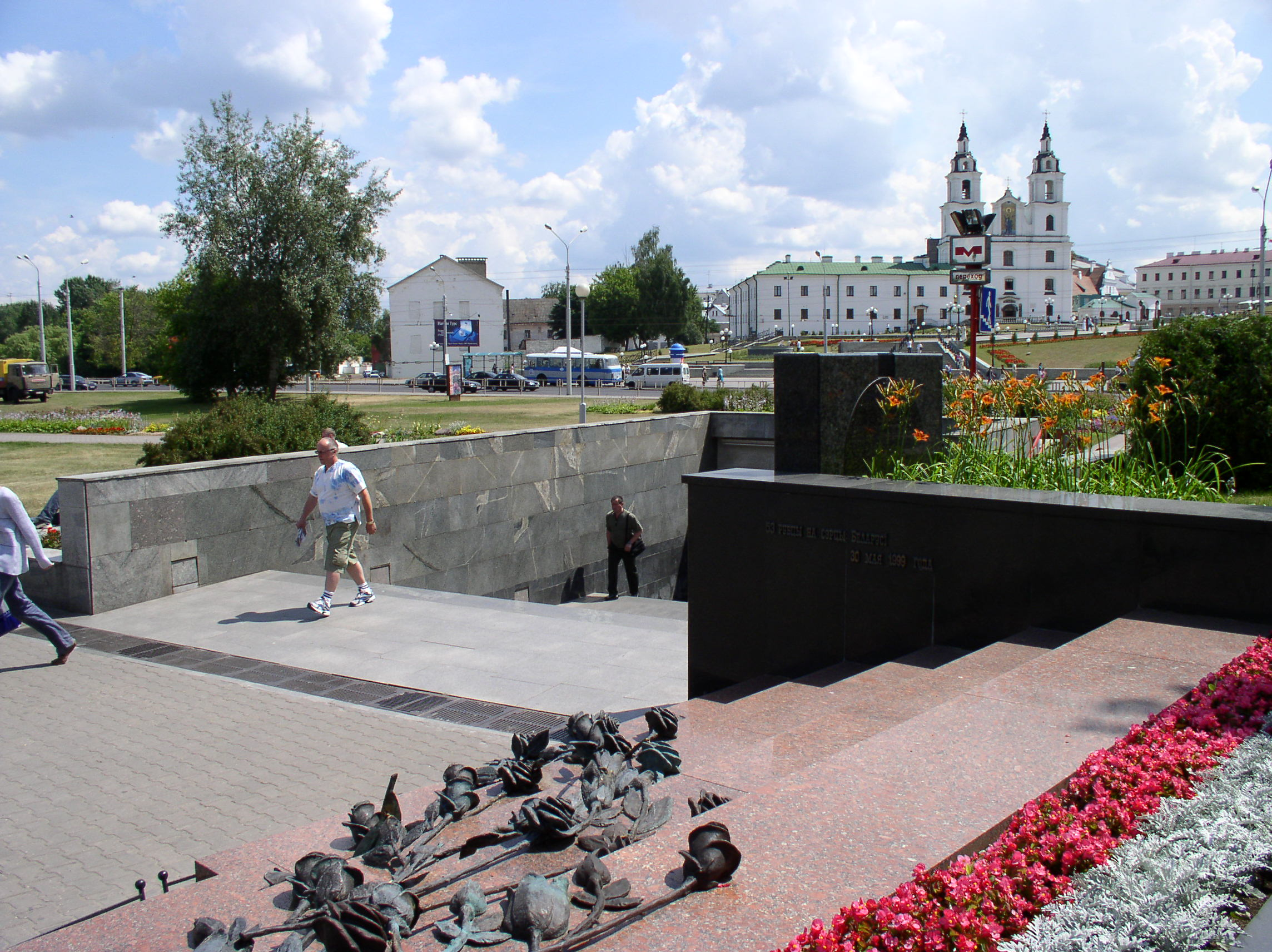
Monument dedicated to the victims of the Nyamiha stampede near the exit of the station
