= Cold Synagogue, Minsk =

Former synagogue in Minsk, Belarus

Cold Synagogue
- Yiddish: די קאַלטע שול
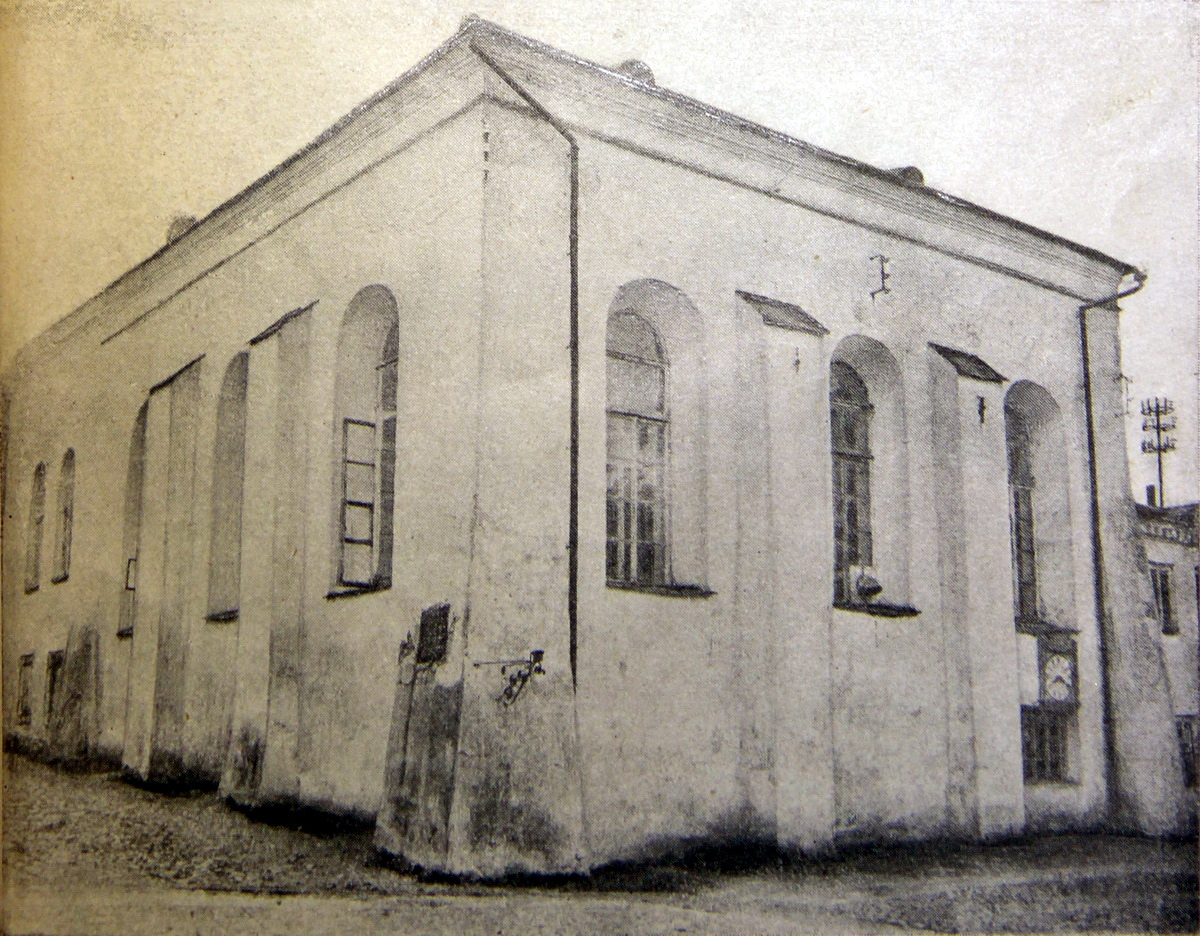
- The former synagogue, in 1928

- Location of the former synagogue in Belarus

Religion
- Affiliation: Judaism (former)
- Ecclesiastical or organisational status: Church (1570–1796); Synagogue (1796–1930)
- Status: Closed; subsequently destroyed

Location
- Location: Minsk, Minsk Region
- Country: Belarus
- Coordinates: 53°54′16″N 27°33′11″E

Architecture
- Type: Synagogue architecture
- Style: Romanesque
- Completed: 1570 (as a church); 1796 (as a synagogue)
- Destroyed: 1965
- Materials: Masonry

The Cold Synagogue (Yiddish: די קאַלטע שול, Belarusian: Халодная сінагога, romanized: Chalodnaja sinahoha) was a Jewish synagogue located on what is now Niamiha Street, in the center of Minsk, Belarus. It was not used as a place of study and therefore was not heated, which is why it received the name "Cold". The masonry synagogue was considered the oldest in Minsk.

== History ==
The building was erected in 1570, though it is assumed that it housed an Orthodox church, and only in 1796 the building was bought by the Jewish community, rebuilt and renovated. However, in architectural terms, this structure was originally characteristic of synagogues of that era.

The building was in the Romanesque style.

In 1930, the synagogue was closed.

In 1944, after the liberation of Minsk from the German occupation, the synagogue was again handed over to believing Jews for a short time.

In 1965, the synagogue, although a protected monument, was demolished on the order of Petr Masherov, the leader of Soviet Byelorussia. The destruction occurred as part of the reconstruction of this district of Minsk. The destruction was attributable both to state antisemitism in Soviet Union as well as a more general disregard by Soviet authorities in 1950s and 1960s for historic preservation: much of Old Town Minsk was destroyed in the 1960s reconstruction of Minsk in a socialist urban style. The old synagogue building was next to the planned site for the Belarusian State Institute for Industrial Design.

== Gallery ==
Schemes of the building

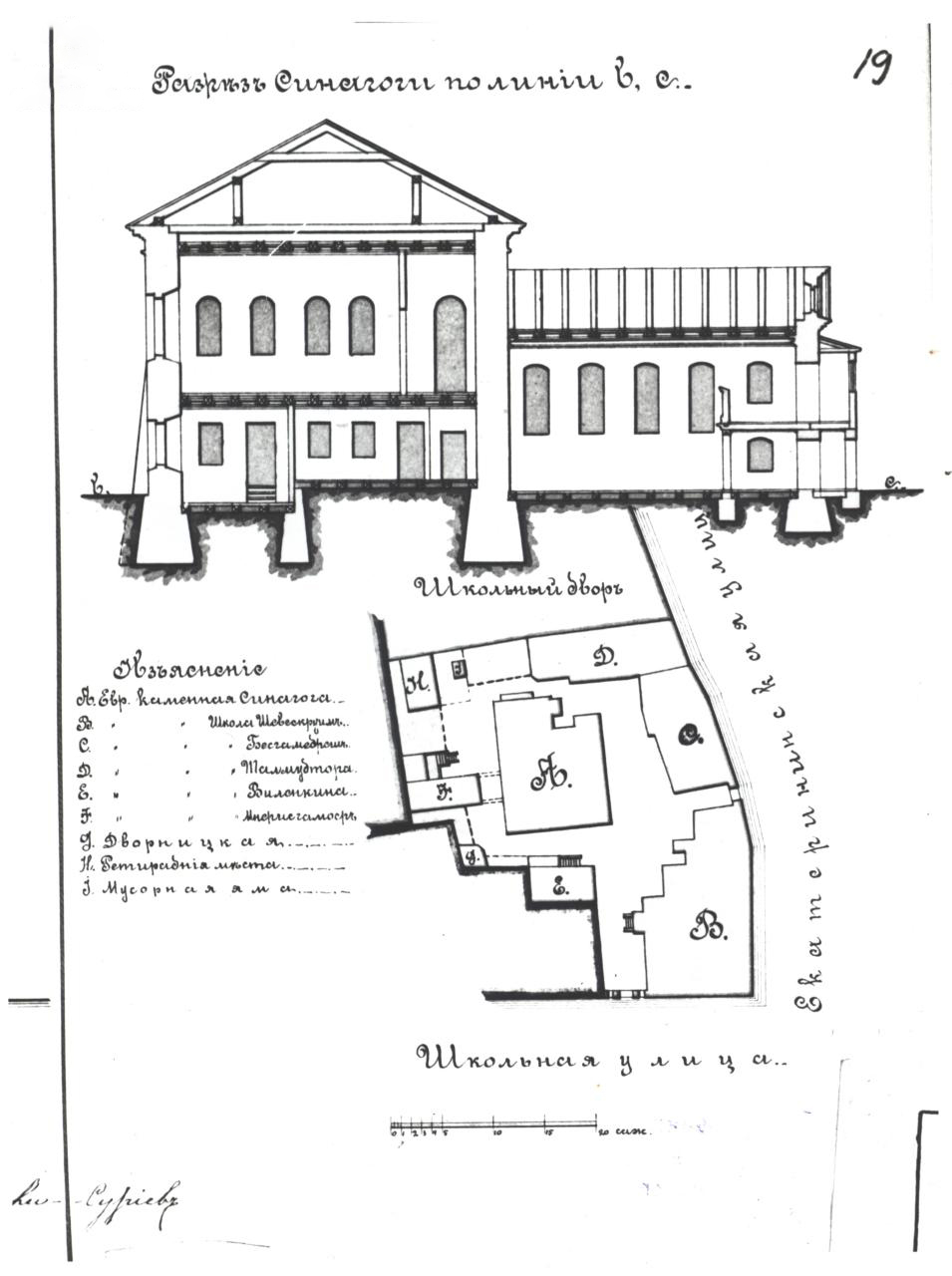
Cross-section, 1881

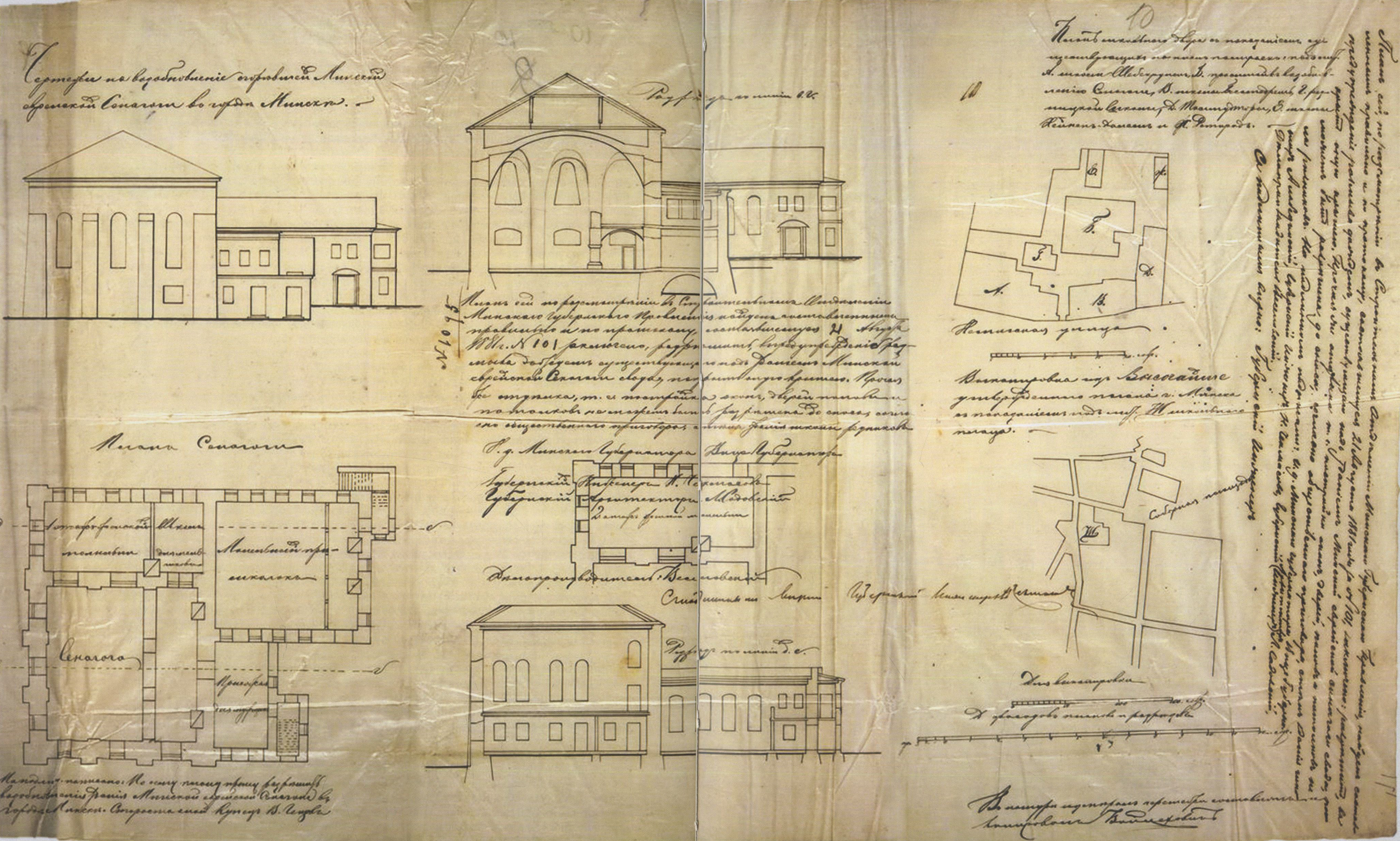
Detailed plans, 1881

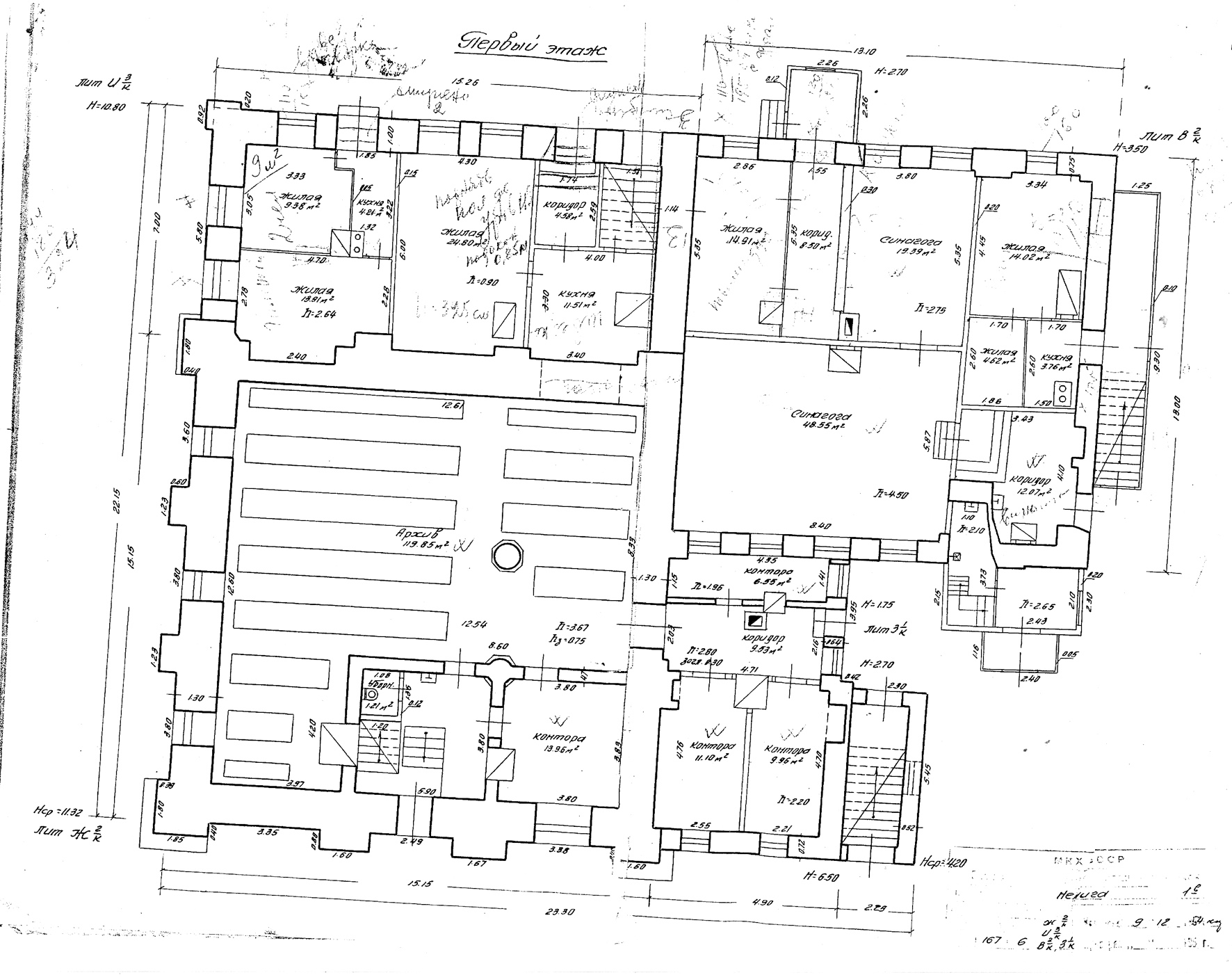
Ground floor plan, made in 1954 during the reconstruction
Photos

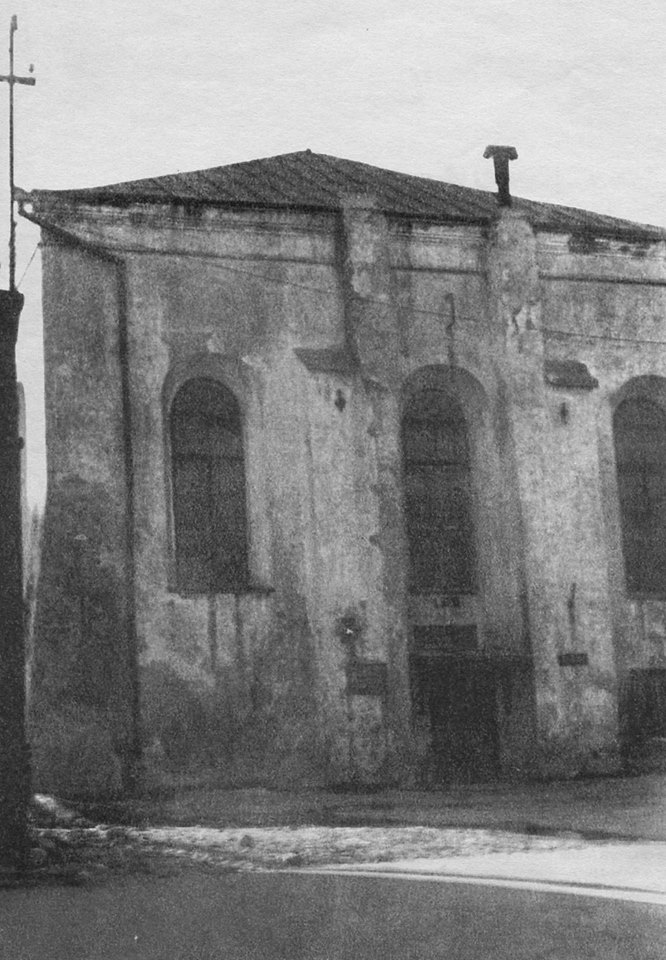
Photo made between 1901-1918

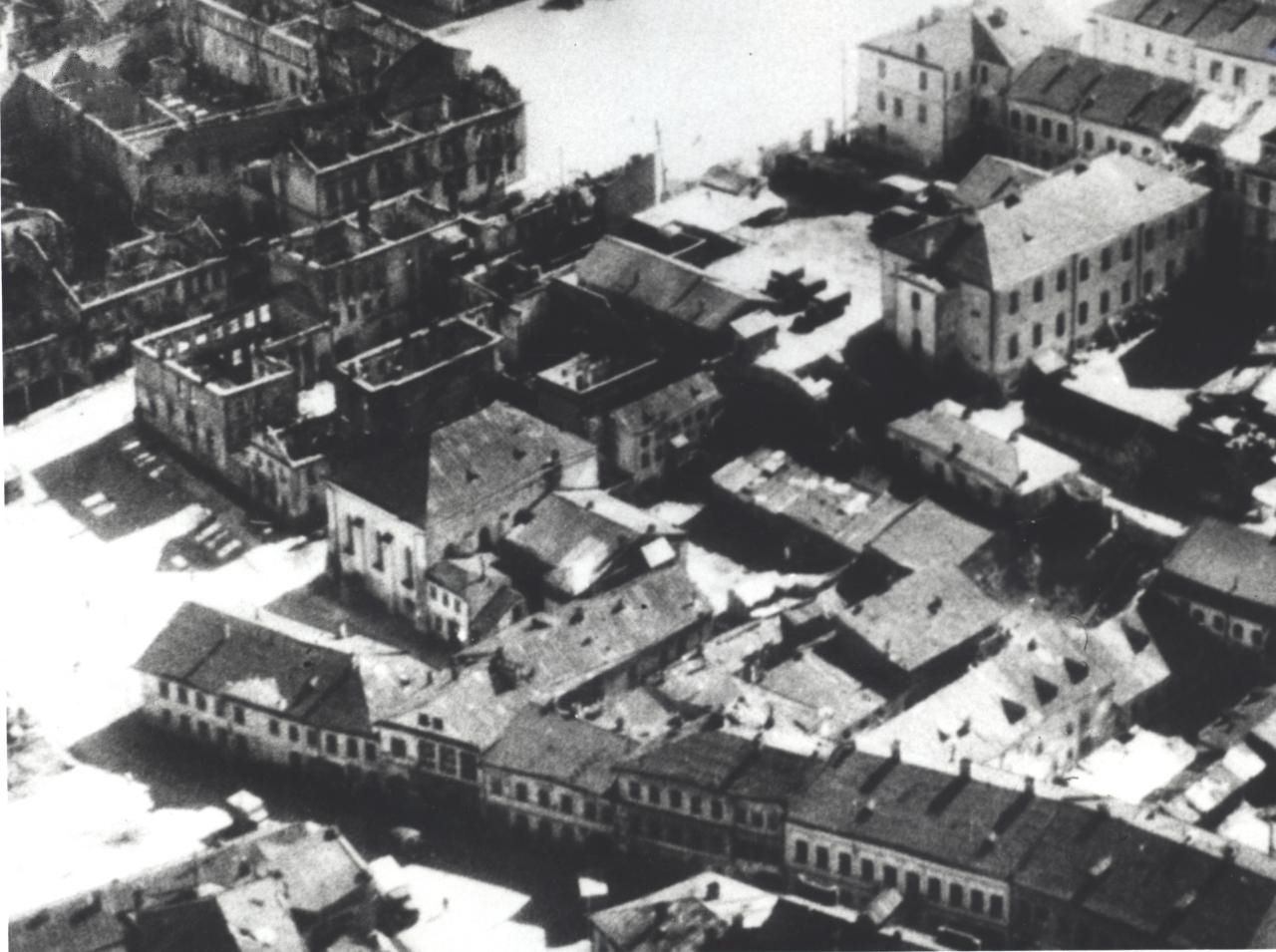
Aerial photo of the district with the synagogue at its center, 1941

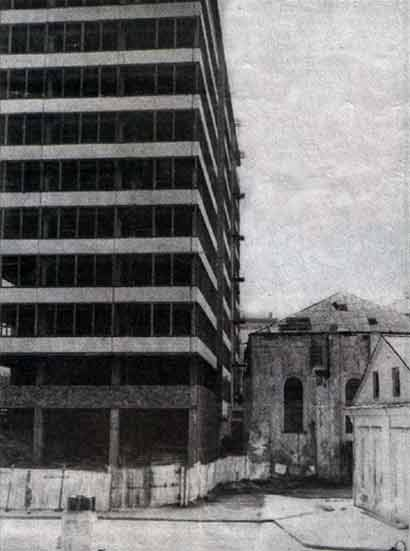
The synagogue near the newly built Institute, 1960s

== See also ==
- Cold Synagogue, Mogilev
- Cold Synagogue, Slutsk
