= Nyamiha stampede =

1999 crowd crush in Minsk, Belarus

Coordinates: 53.9053°N 27.5525°E

Nyamiha Stampede
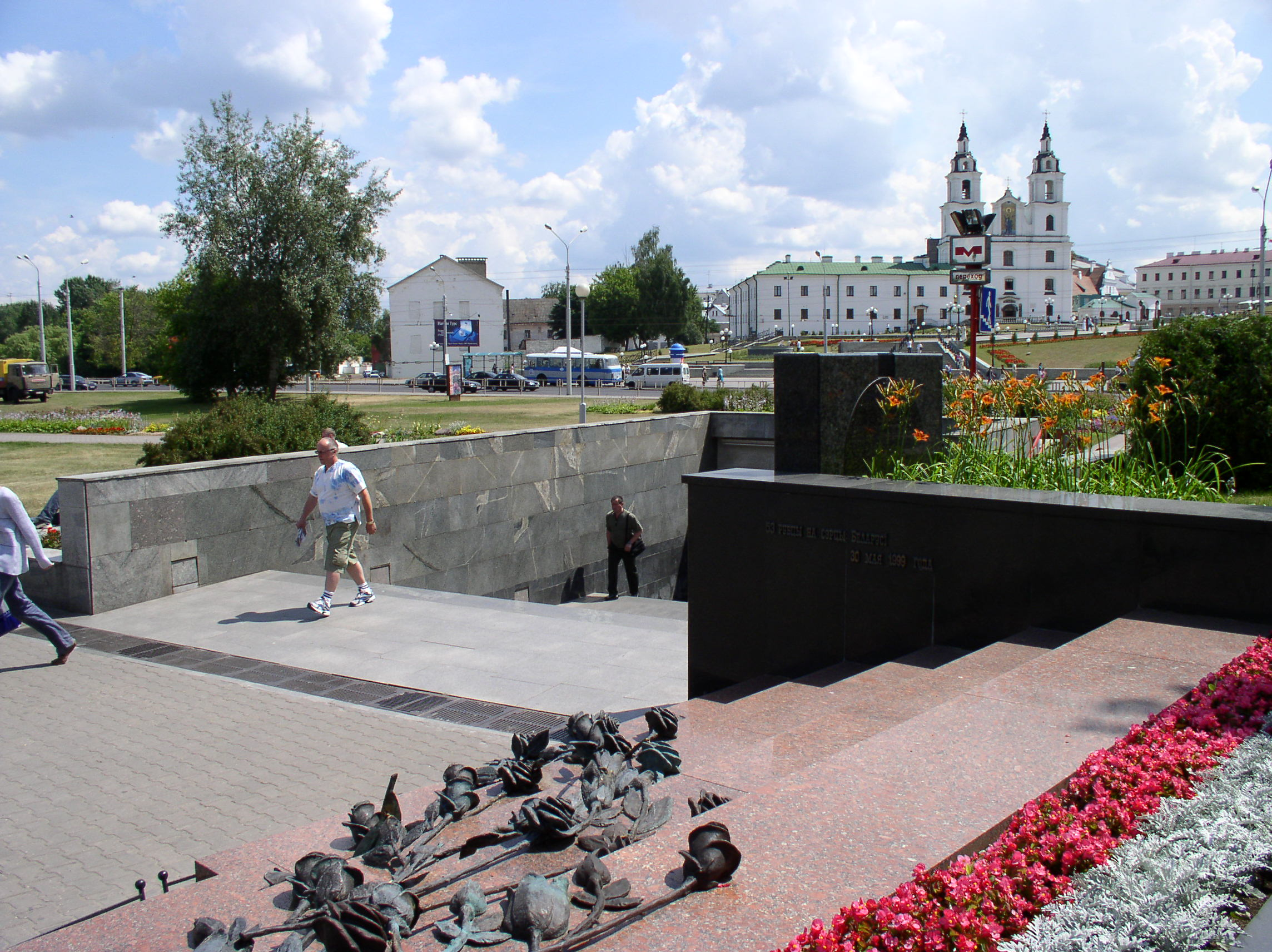
- Entrance to the Niamiha metro station in 2005
- Date: 30 May 1999
- Location: Minsk, Belarus
- Deaths: 53

A stampede at the Nyamiha metro station in Minsk, Belarus, on 30 May 1999, killed 53 people, mostly young women.

== Disaster ==
A group of more than 2000 people, mostly teenagers and schoolchildren, gathered near the Minsk Sports Palace to watch a performance by then-popular Soviet rock band Mango-Mango held in celebration of the radio station Mir FM's second anniversary. It was a warm and sunny day, but hail and thunderstorms had been forecast for that evening. The concert started at 8 p.m. The police attempted to control the crowd attending the concert, but there were no barriers.

A sudden thunderstorm caused a large crowd from the concert to seek shelter at the metro station. The stampede was funneled into the blocked underpass of the metro station and many people (mostly young women) were killed in the ensuing crowd crush when they started slipping on the wet pavement, falling, and trampling each other. The incident was compounded by the fact that much of the crowd had been drinking during the concert, so they did not realize that they were trampling on the victims.

Intensive care units of nearby hospitals were overwhelmed with the influx of victims. In the first half hour after the disaster, victims were brought to hospitals in cars and minibuses, along with police cars and ambulances.

=== Victims ===
The official death toll was 53. The victims died from suffocation and trampling. A survivor of the disaster recalls seeing a corpse with a hole in the stomach, caused by a thin shoe heel from a woman's shoe. Most of the victims were young women and girls aged 14-20. Only three of the victims (36, 47, and 61) were older. Two police officers were also killed in the crush.

== Aftermath ==
Many eyewitnesses to the disaster believed that it could have been prevented if the police had not allowed such a large group to rush into the metro station at the same time.

Belarus had a two-day mourning period after the event.

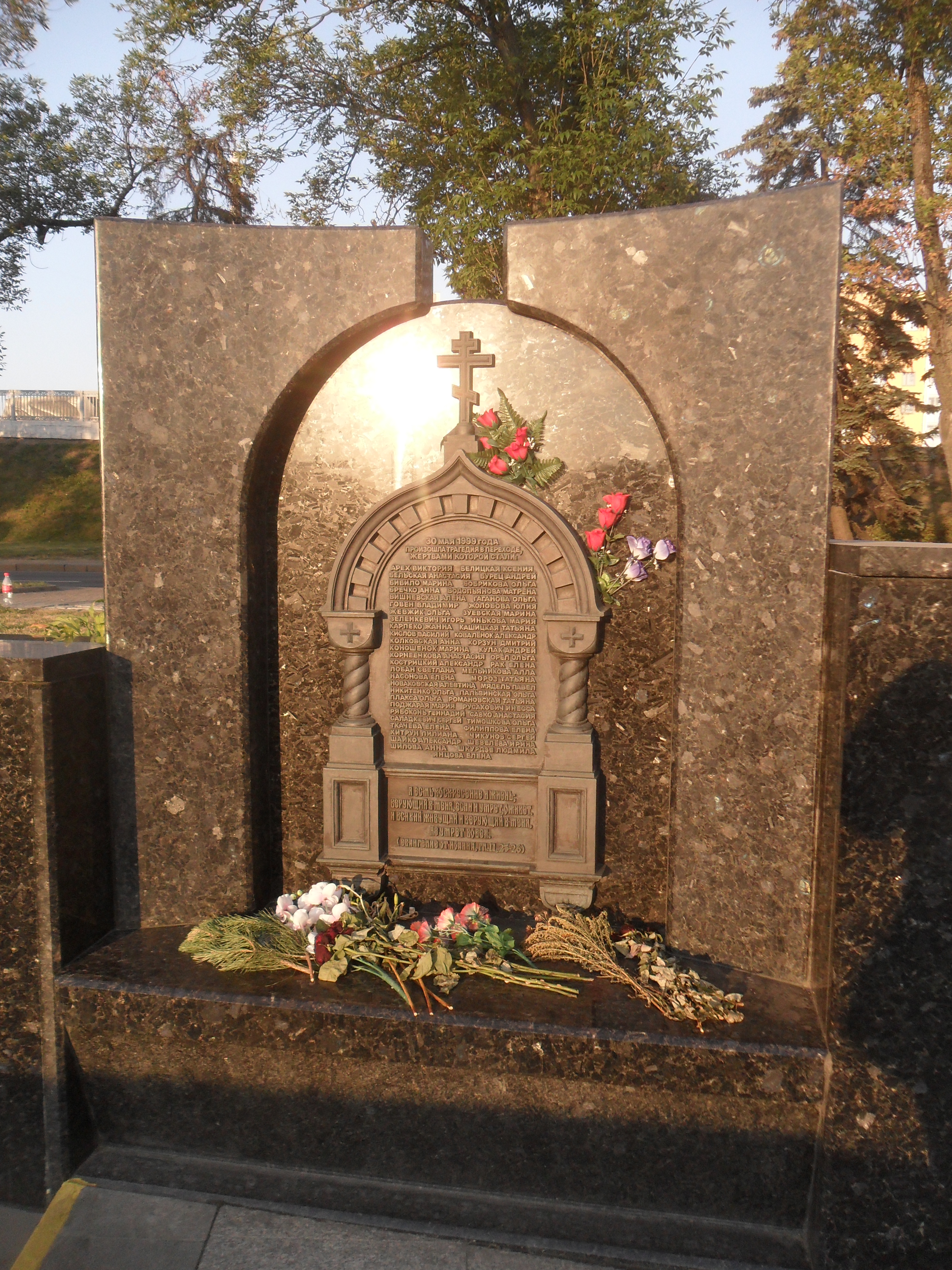
A memorial at the site of the disaster in at the Nyamiha metro station

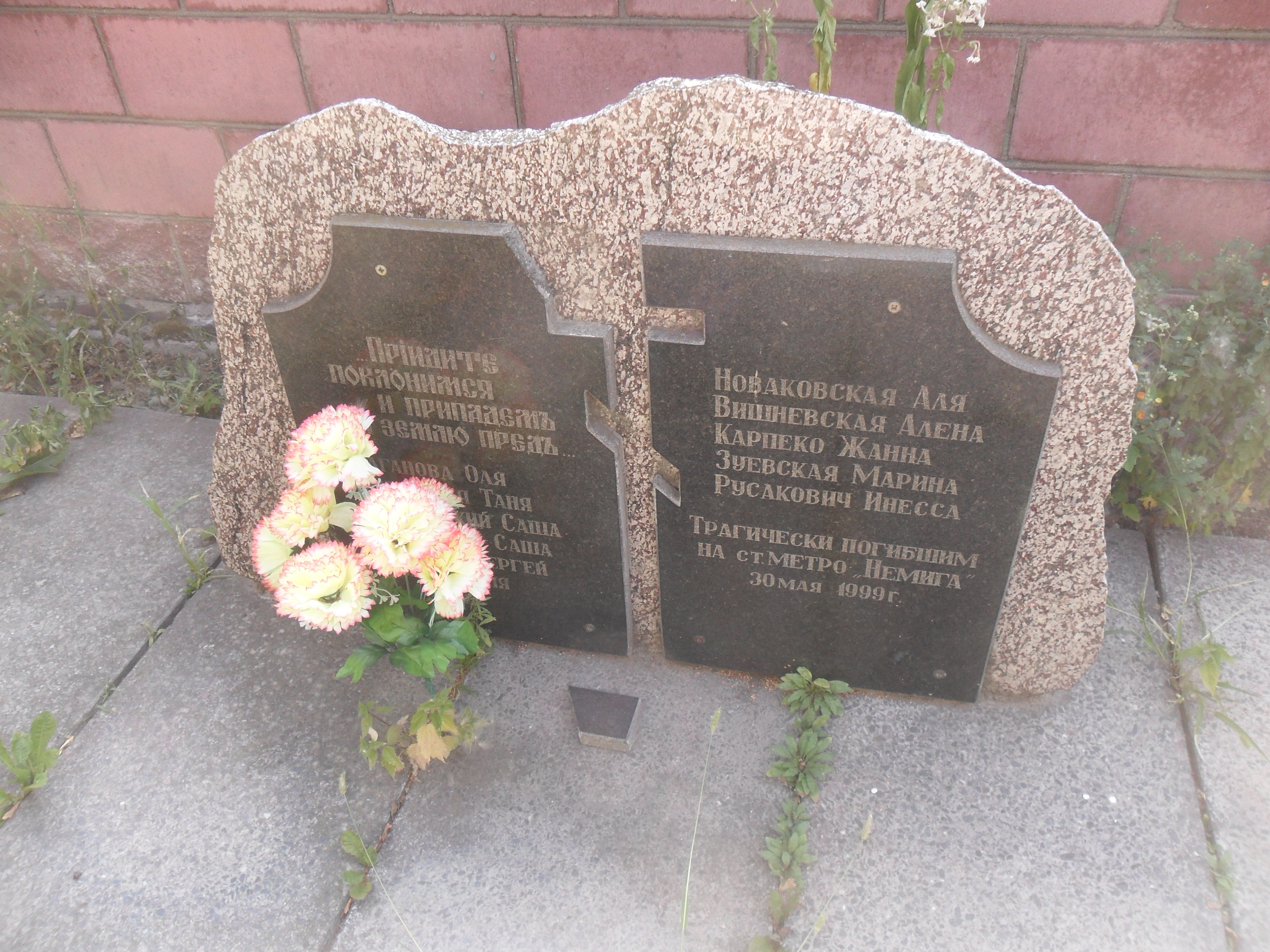
Memorial plaque at the Chizhovsky cemetery in Minsk

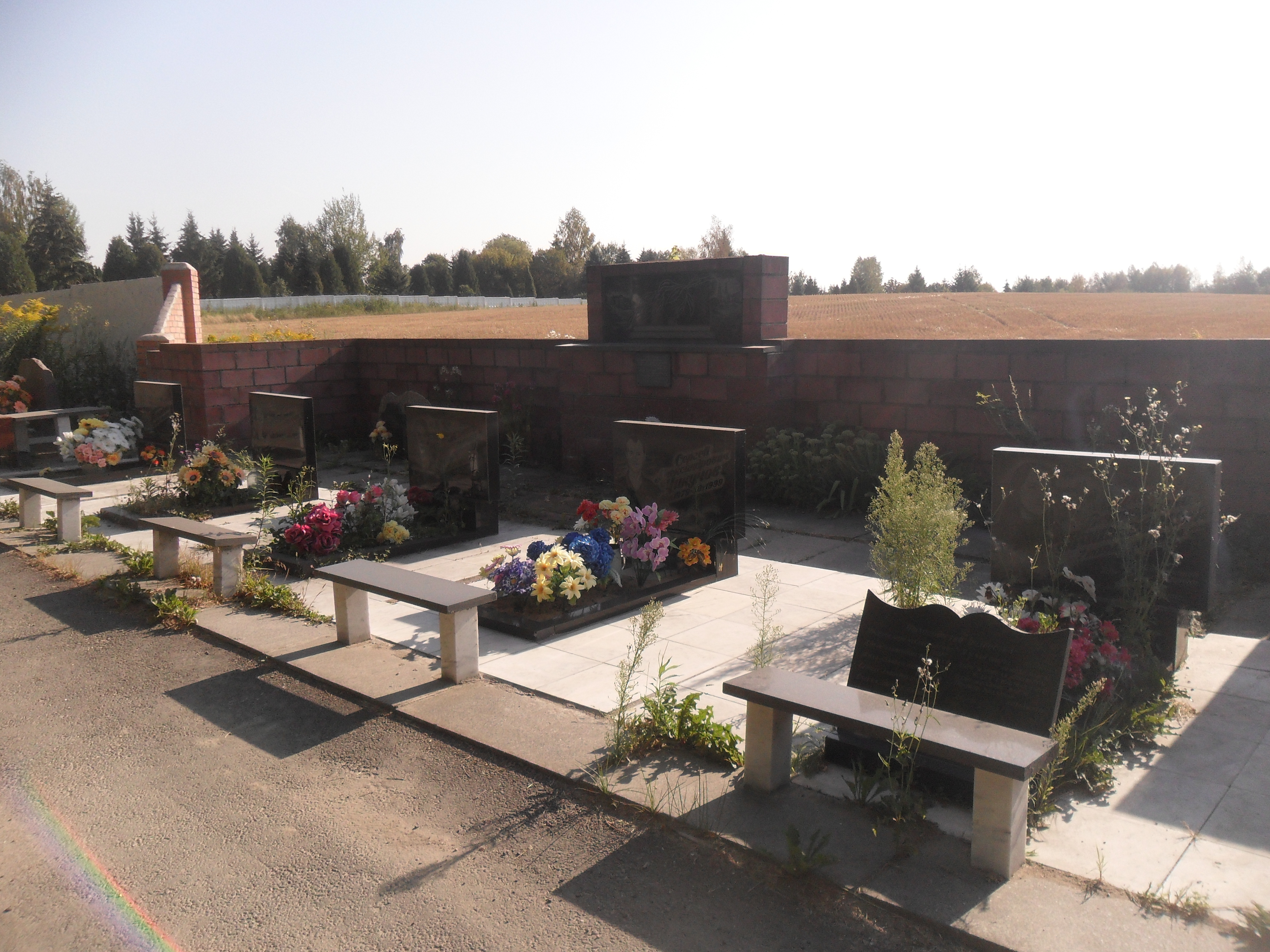
Alley of graves of the victims of the crush at the Chizhovsky cemetery in Minsk

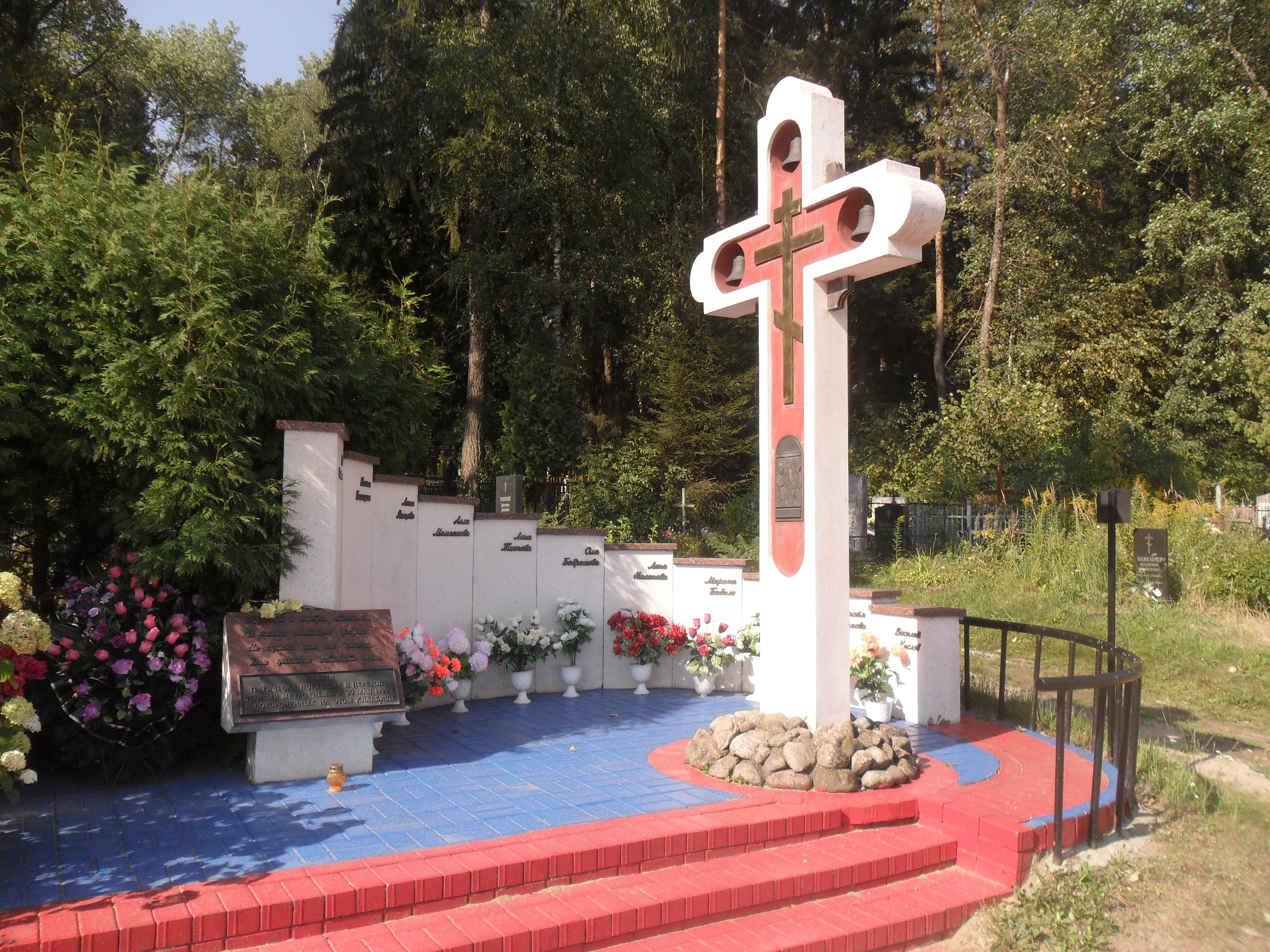
Memorial to the victims of the crush at the Eastern Minsk cemetery
