= Vakzaĺnaja (Minsk Metro) =

Minsk Metro Station

Vakzaĺnaja Вакзальная
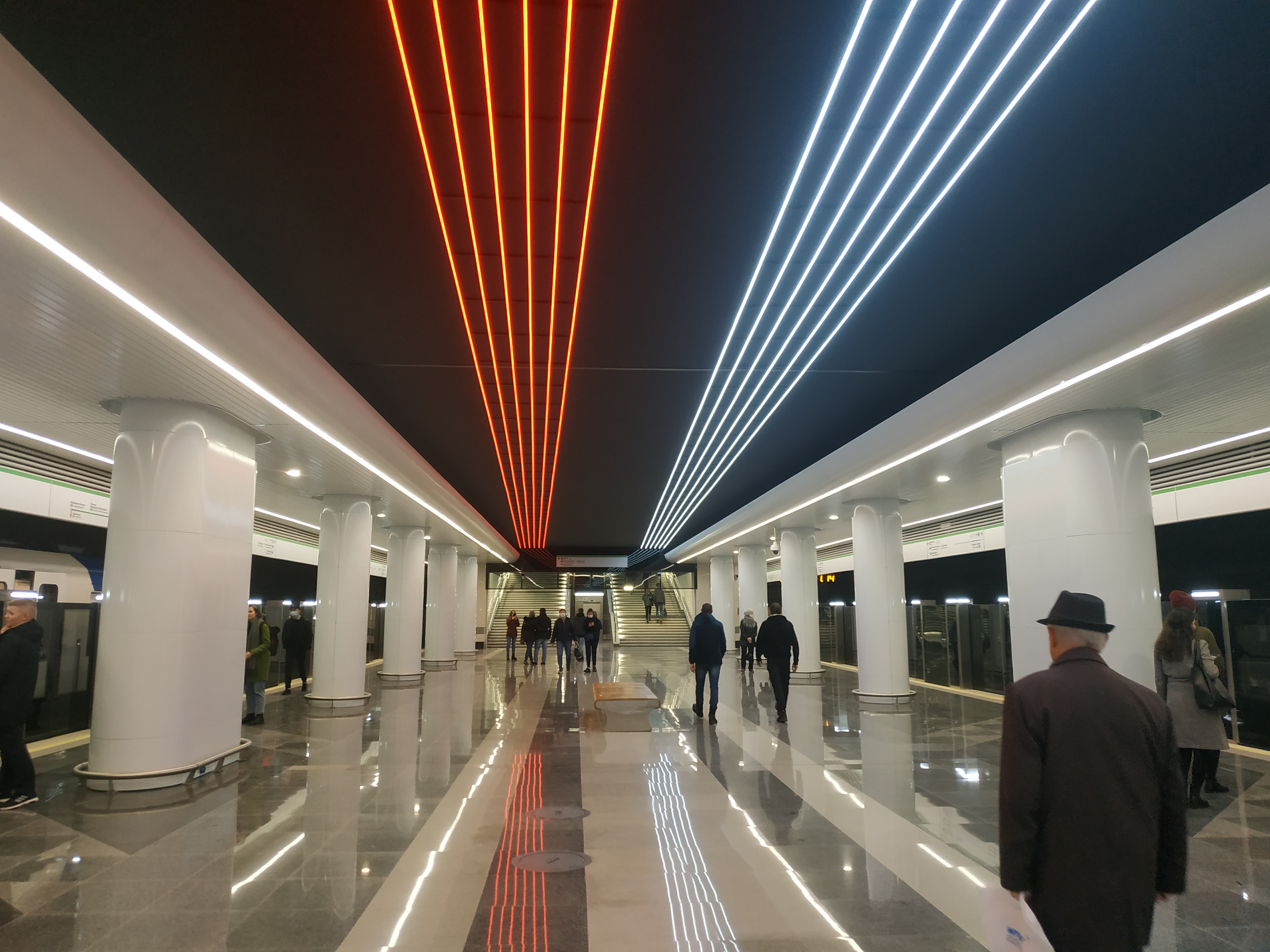
- Vakzaĺnaja metro station, Minsk

General information
- Coordinates: 53.8897°N 27.5473°E
- System: Minsk Metro
- Owner: Minsk Metro
- Line: Zelenaluzhskaya line
- Platforms: 1 island platform
- Tracks: 2
- Connections: Maskoŭskaja line (Ploshcha Lyenina)

Construction
- Structure type: Underground

Other information
- Station code: 314

History
- Opened: 6 November 2020; 5 years ago

Services
Preceding station	Minsk Metro	Following station
Plošča Franciška Bahuševiča towards Jubiliejnaja plošča	Zelenaluzhskaya line	Kavaĺskaja Slabada Terminus
Kastrychnitskaya towards Uručča	Maskoŭskaja line transfer at Ploshcha Lyenina	Instytut Kultury towards Malinawka
Location
- Location within Belarus

Vakzaĺnaja (Belarusian: Вакзальная; Russian: Вокзальная) is a Minsk Metro station. It was opened on 6 November, 2020. The station is located at the intersection of Družnaja and Vakzaĺnaja streets near the main railway station of the city: Minsk Passazhirsky.

It is a transfer station to the Ploshcha Lyenina station on the Maskoŭskaja line.

== Gallery ==
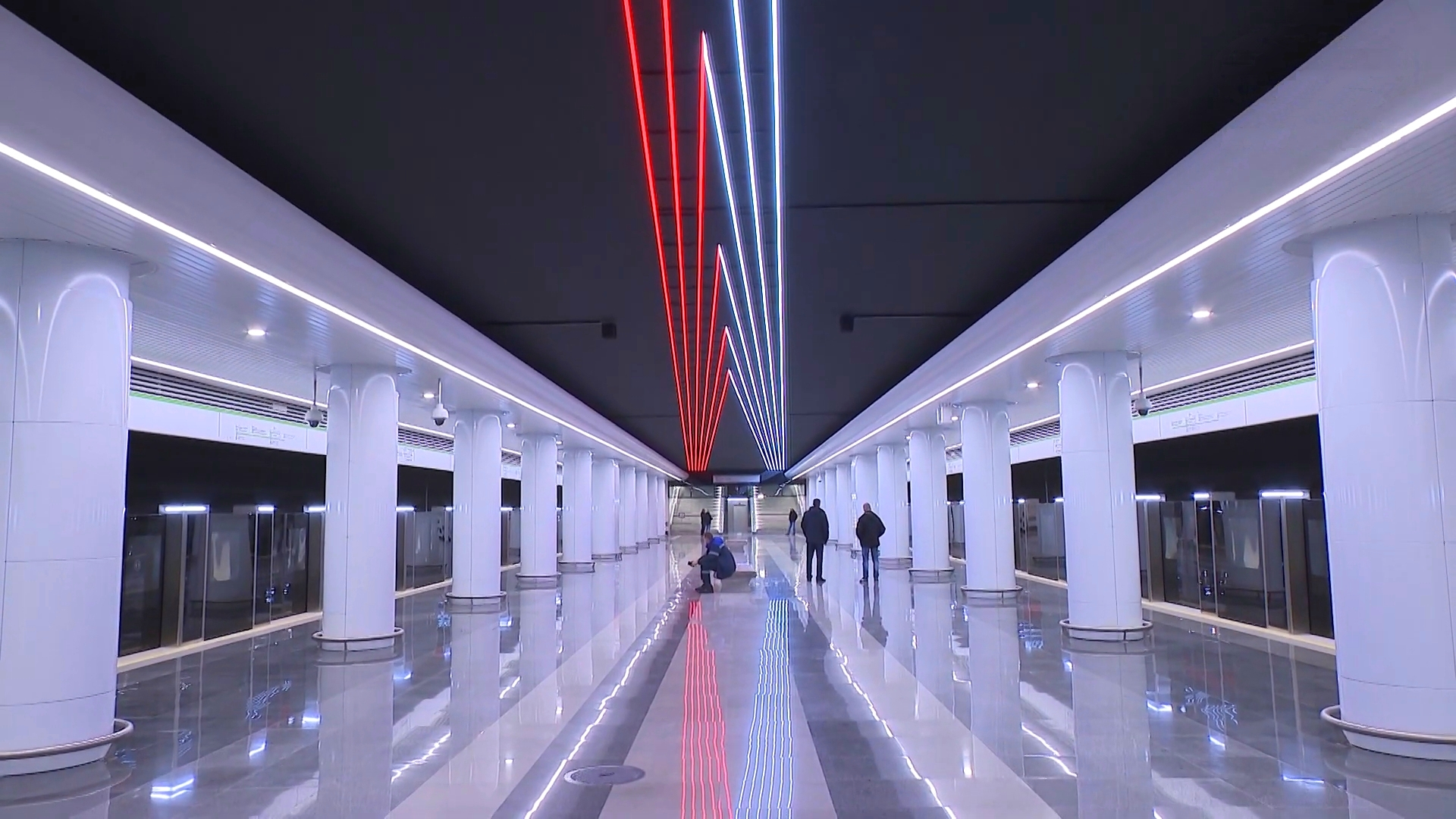

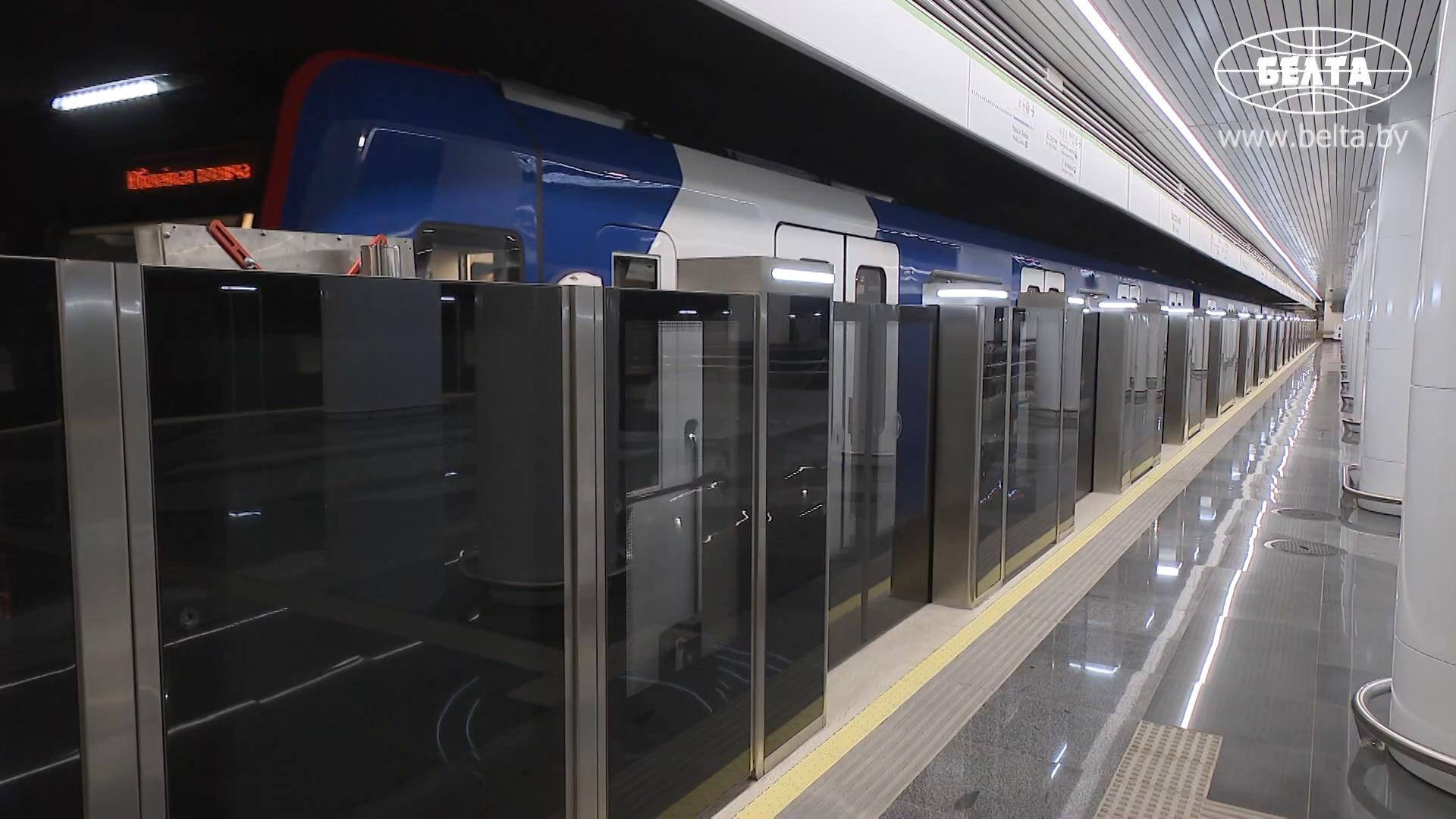

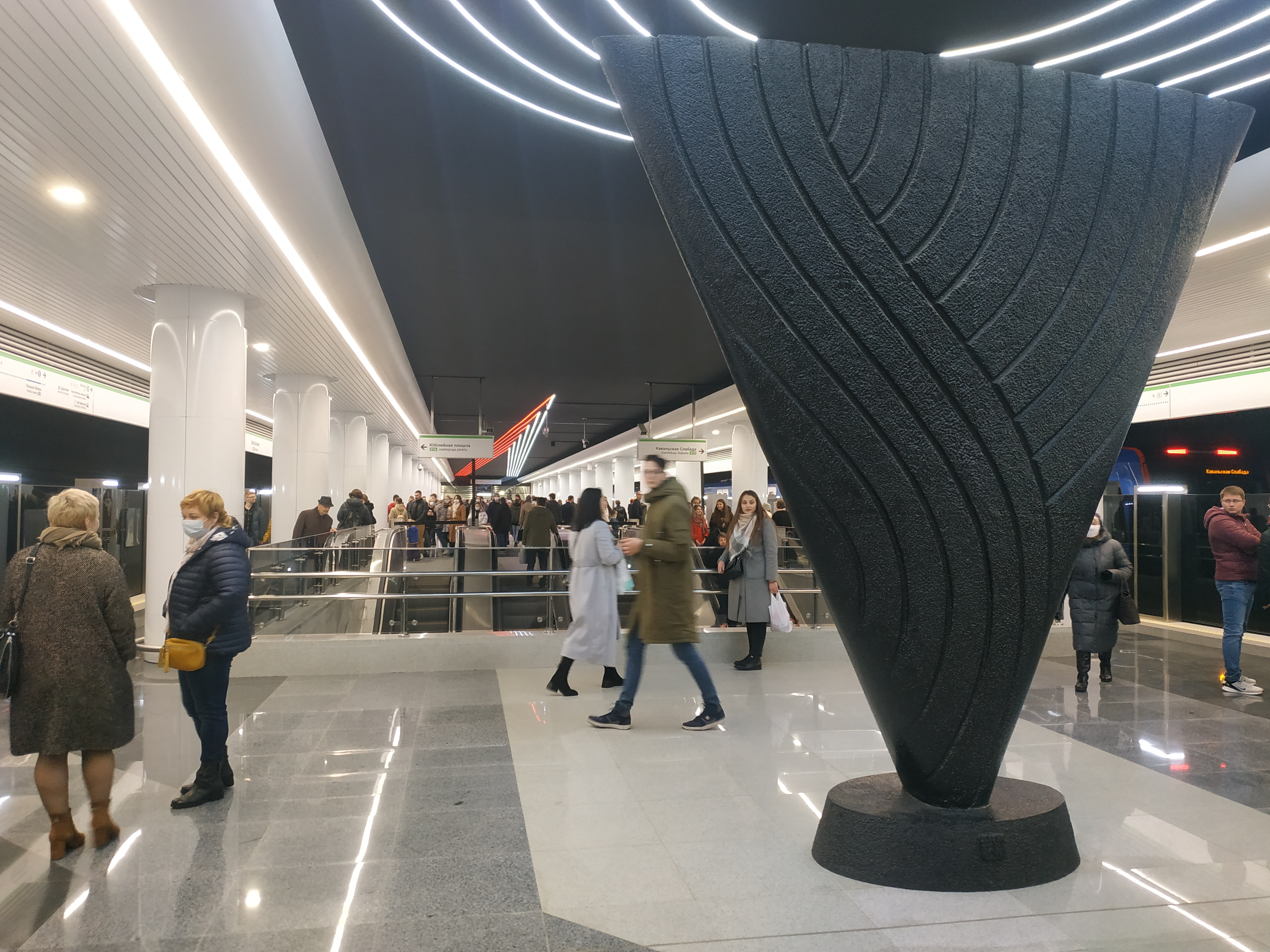

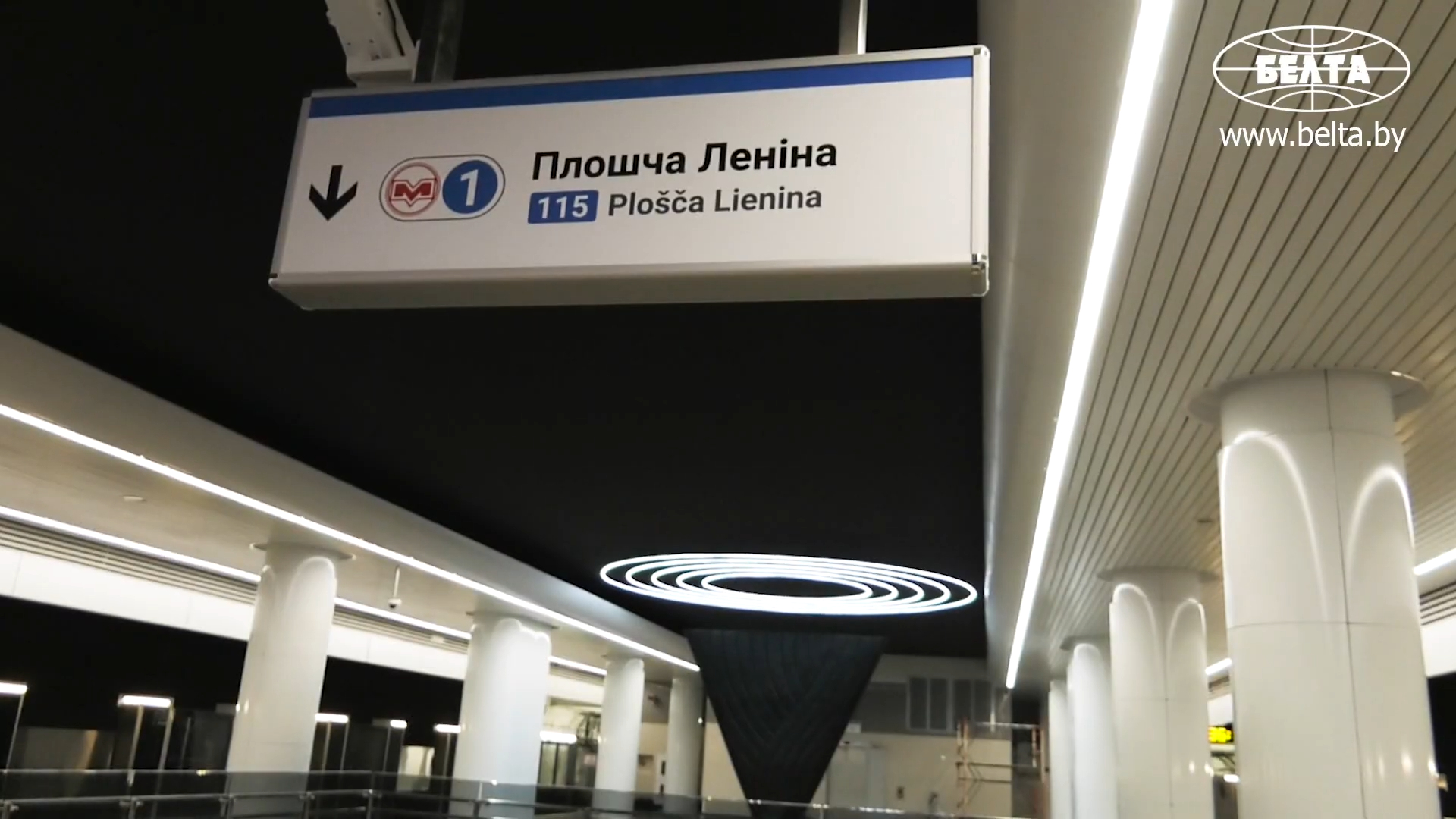

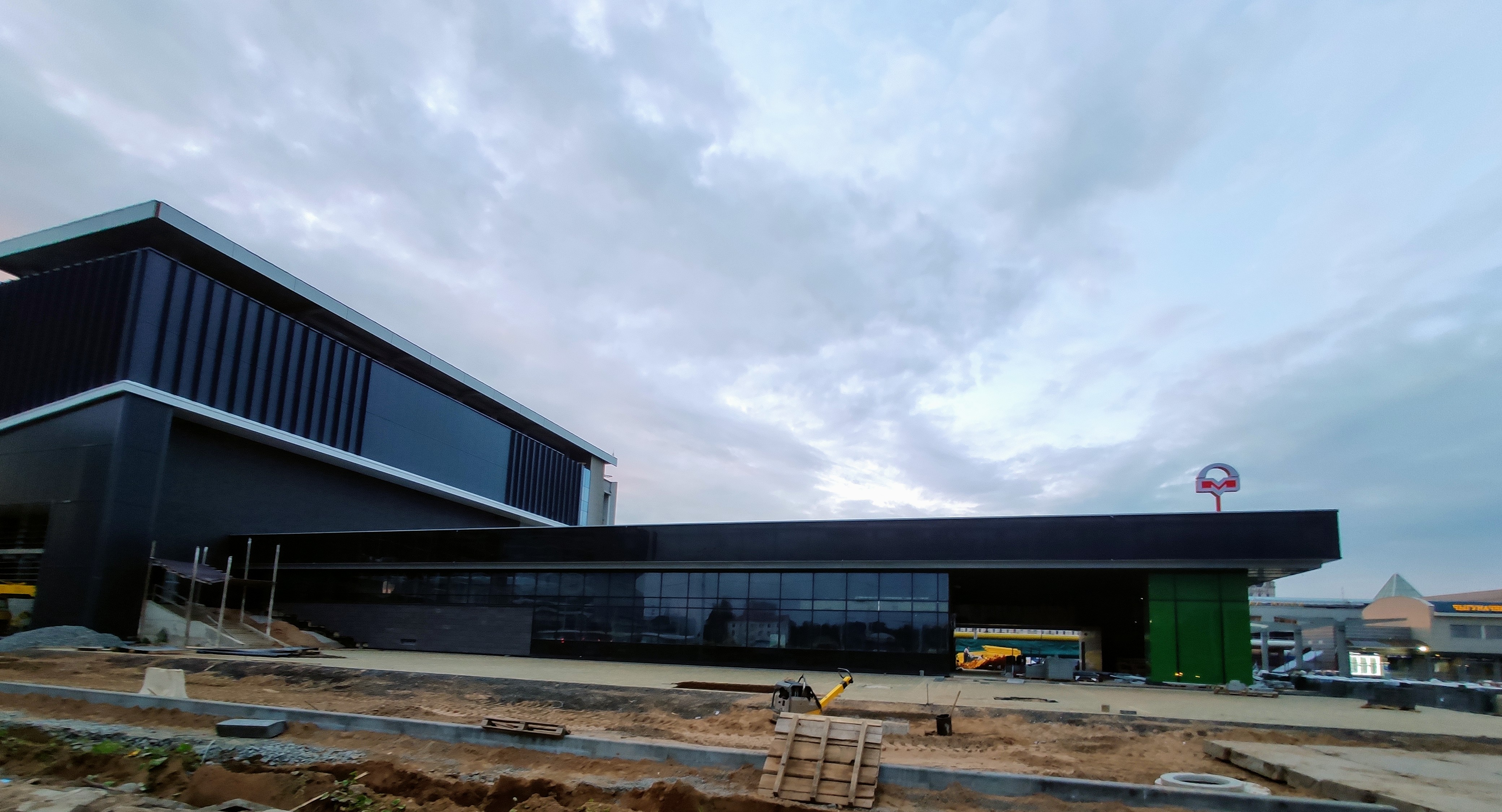

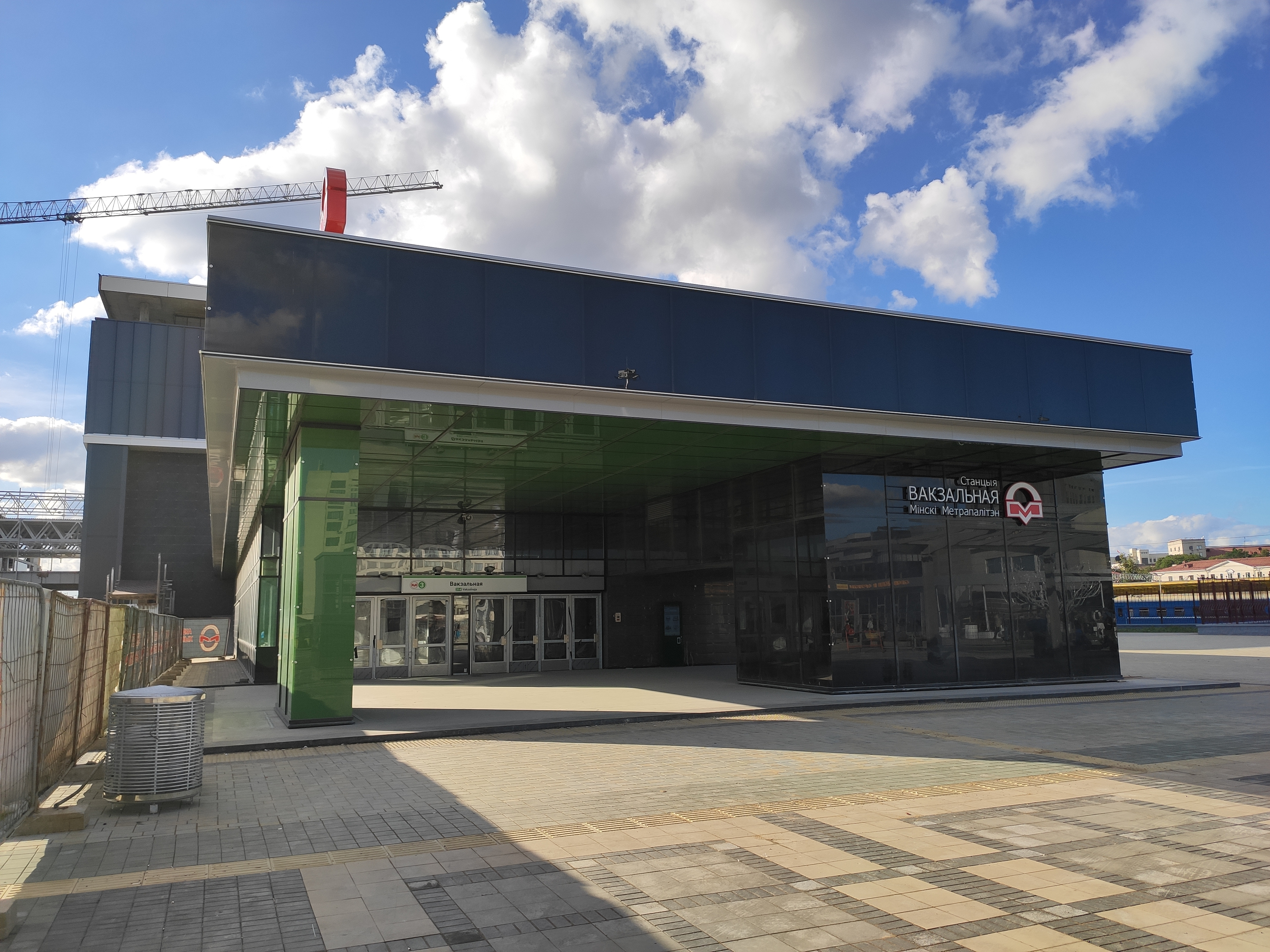

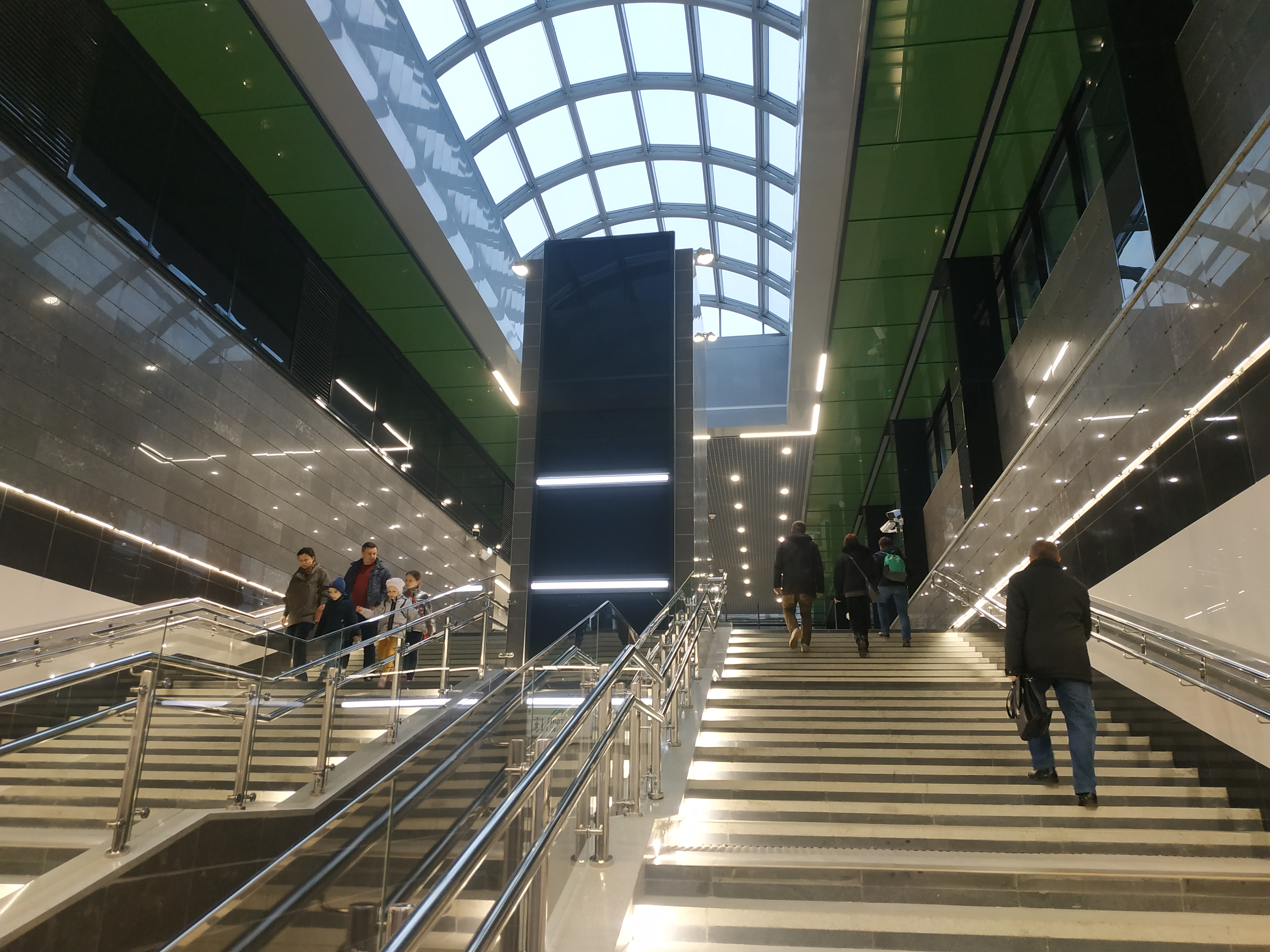

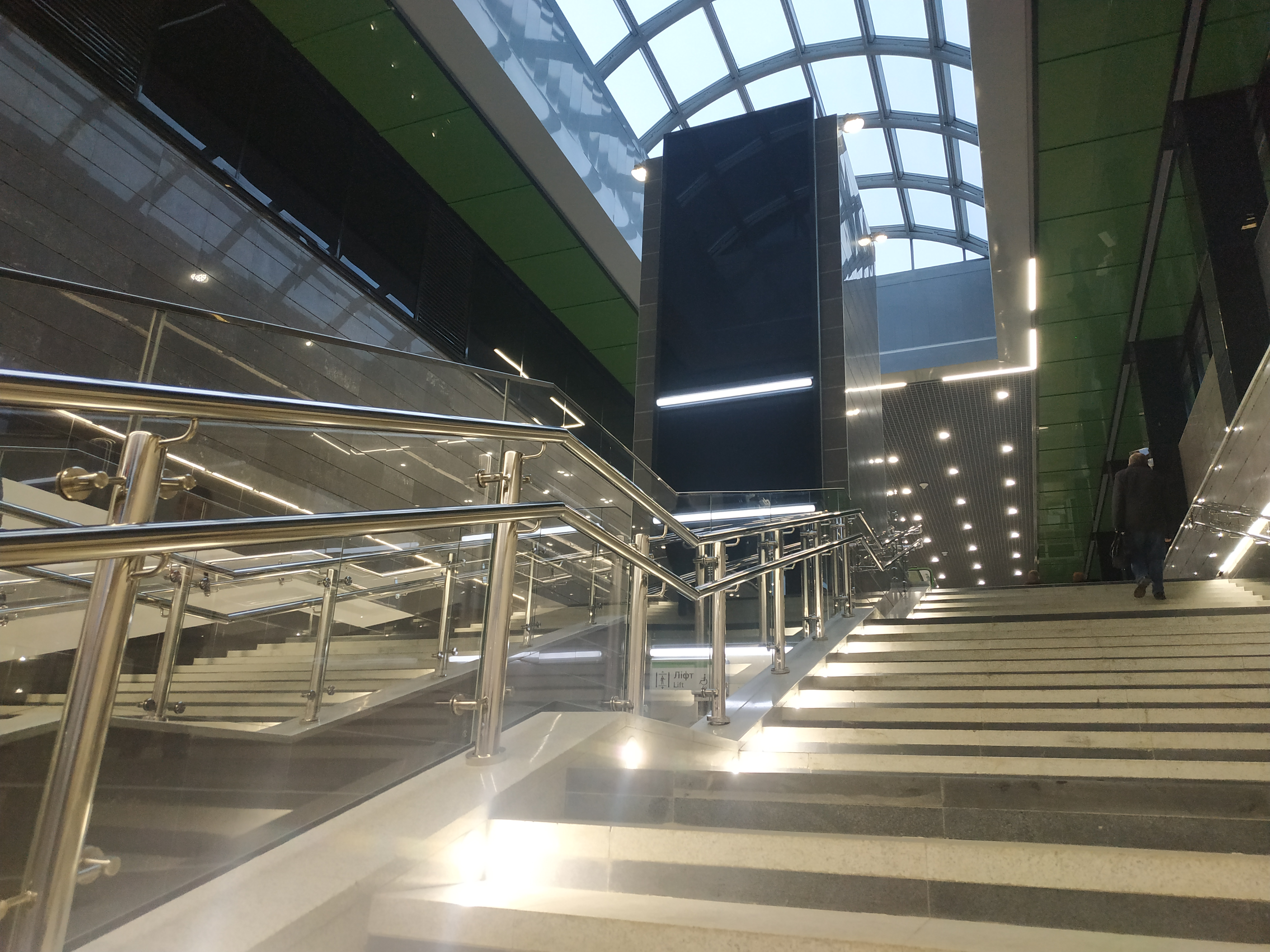

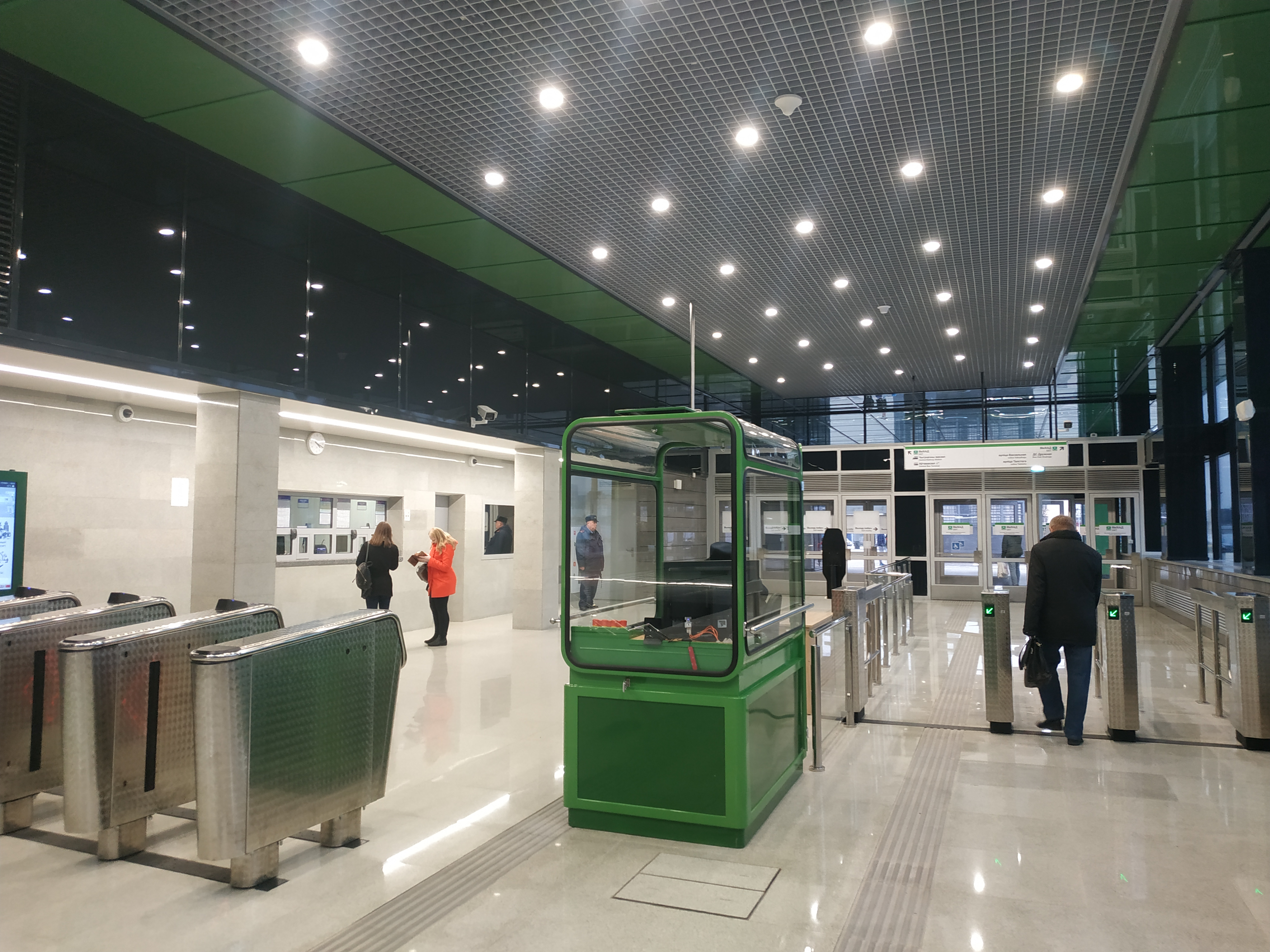

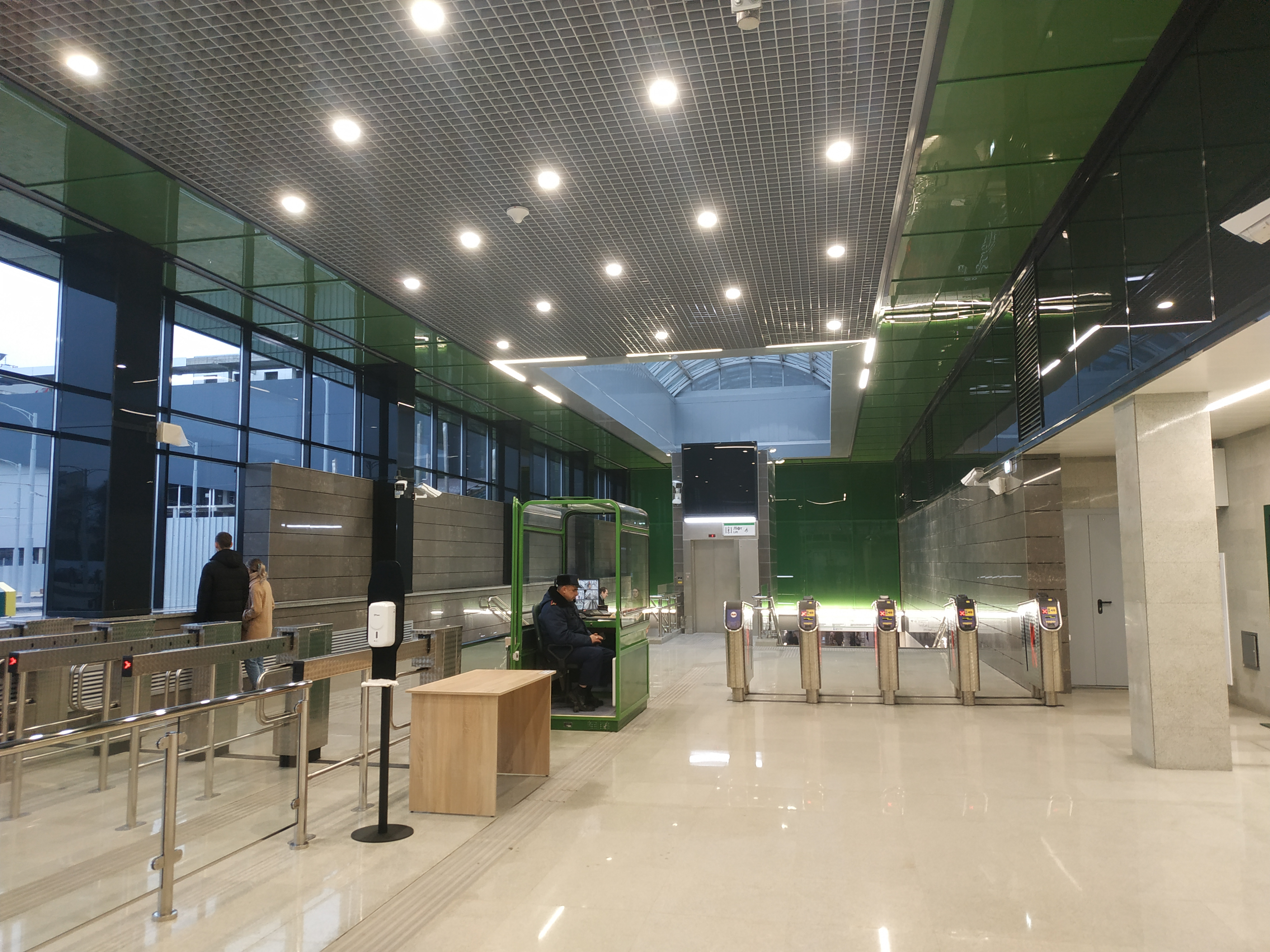
