= 2011 Minsk Metro bombing =

Terrorist attack in Minsk, Belarus

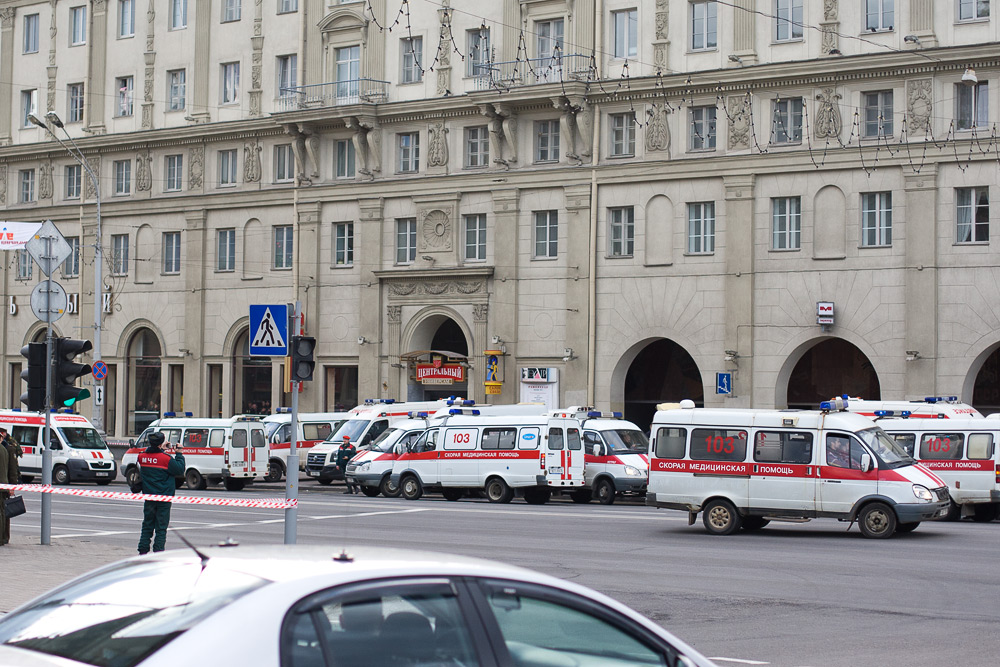
- Emergency services outside Kastrychnitskaya Station
- Location: 53°54′7″N 27°33′43″E; Kastrychnitskaya metro station, Minsk, Belarus
- Date: 11 April 2011; 17:55 local time (UTC+3)
- Target: Minsk Metro
- Attack type: Bombing, mass murder
- Weapon: Nail bomb with 5–7 kg TNT equivalent strength
- Deaths: 15
- Injuries: 315
- Perpetrators: Dzmitry Kanavalau and Uladzislau Kavalyou

The 2011 Minsk Metro bombing took place on 11 April 2011 when 15 people were killed and 315 were injured when a bomb exploded within the Minsk Metro, Belarus. The explosion happened at the central Kastrychnitskaya station at 17:55 local time.

Initially the cause of the explosion was unclear, but was found to have been a bomb. The Prosecution Office launched a criminal investigation and classified the event as a terrorist attack. Two suspects arrested on 13 April confessed to the bombing but the motives remained unclear. In March 2012, both perpetrators, Dzmitry Kanavalau and Uladzislau Kavalyou, were executed by shooting.

There has been considerable debate about the possibility that the Belarusian government itself was behind the bombing. The UN Security Council statement condemning the bombing refers to "the apparent terrorist attack". The trial attracted international political condemnation and the verdicts passed out have been questioned, primarily by the Belarusian opposition and the EU. The bombing came at a time of a serious economic crisis and protests against President Alexander Lukashenko's government.

== Background ==
The bombing of the Minsk Metro led to the country's largest loss of life since 53 people were crushed to death at Nyamiha in 1999.

Previous bombings in the recent history of Belarus did not result in any fatalities. In September 2005, two bombings occurred in the northeastern city of Vitebsk. The first was blamed on criminal gangs, and the second, in which 46 people were injured outside a cafe, on hooliganism. During the Belarus Independence Day celebrations on 4 July 2008, 54 people were injured when a bomb exploded at a concert in Minsk. Like the bombing at the Vitebsk cafe in 2005, the concert bombing in Minsk was blamed on hooliganism.

The 2010 Belarusian presidential election was held in December. Lukashenko won 79.65% of the vote (he gained 5,130,557 votes) with 90.65% of the electorate voting. Up to 40,000 people protested against Lukashenko and about 600 were arrested. The economic crisis of 2011 meant that the ruble fell considerably during the year and the average salary (in dollars) decreased by 38% between December 2010 and May 2011. This would inspire further protests against Lukashenko's government in June of that year.

== Bombing ==
External videos
- Compilation of CCTV footage of the blast

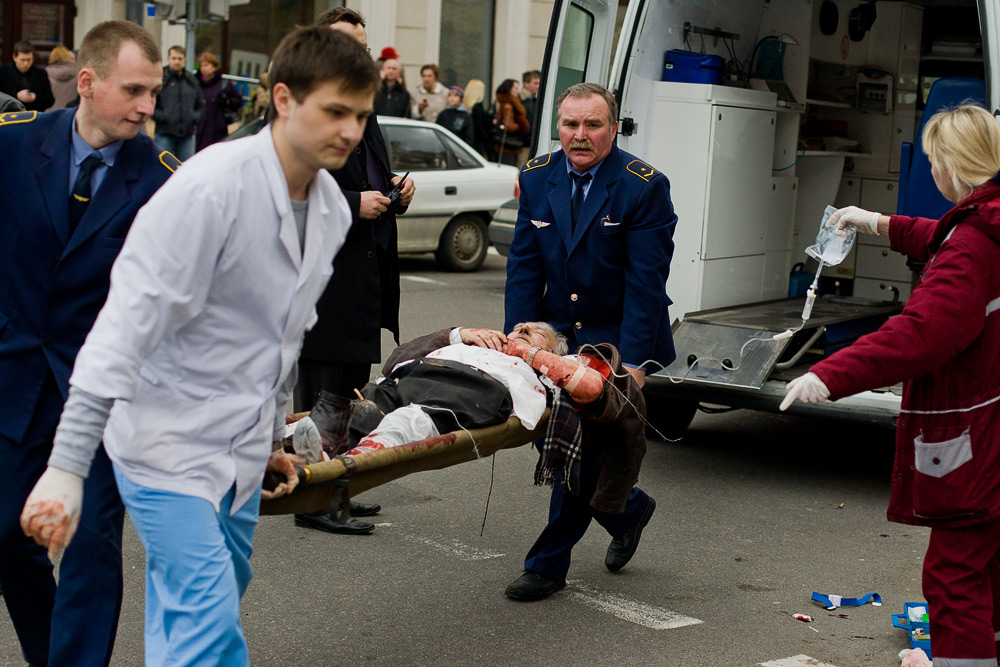
A wounded victim being evacuated

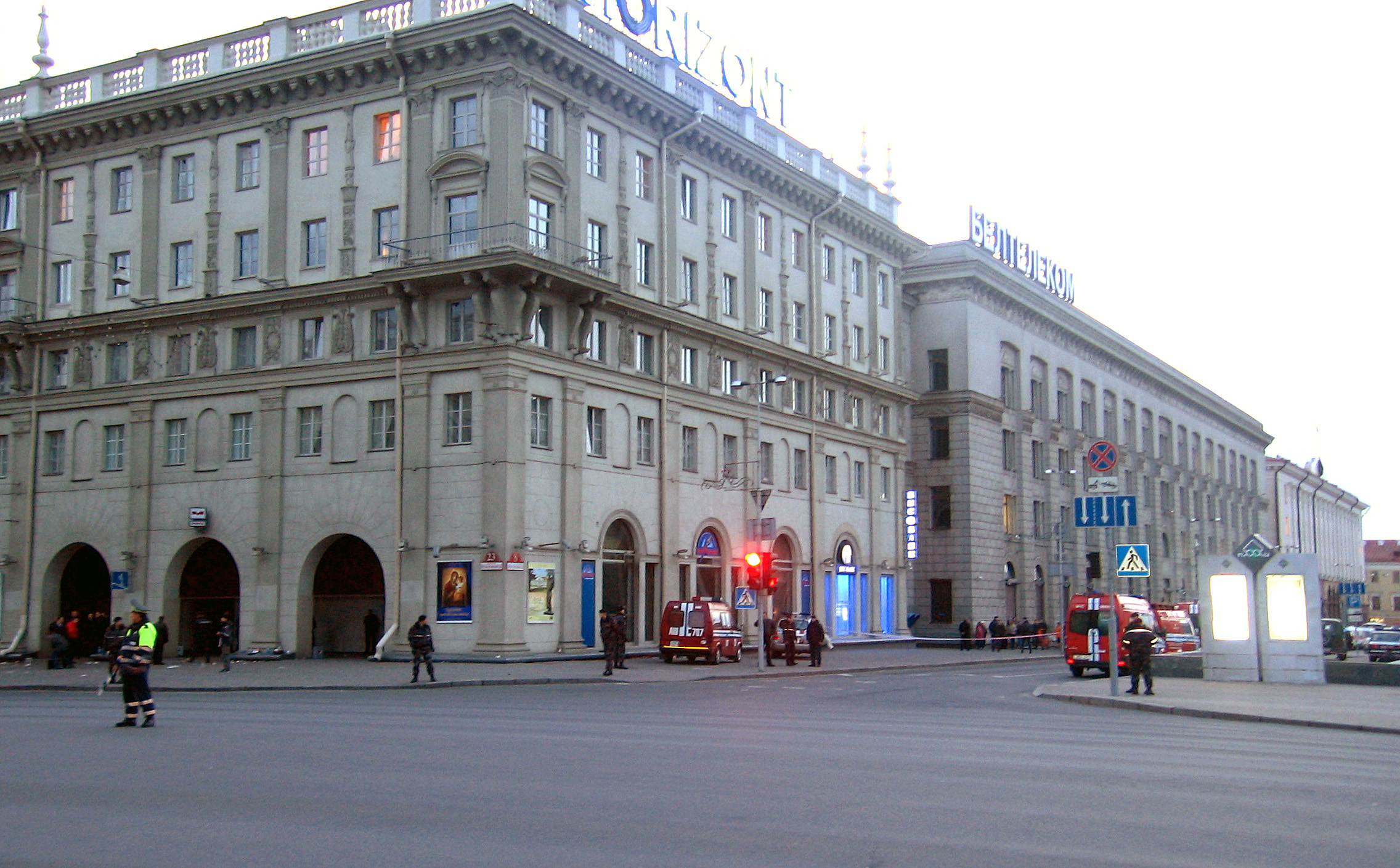
An area cordoned off two hours after the bombing

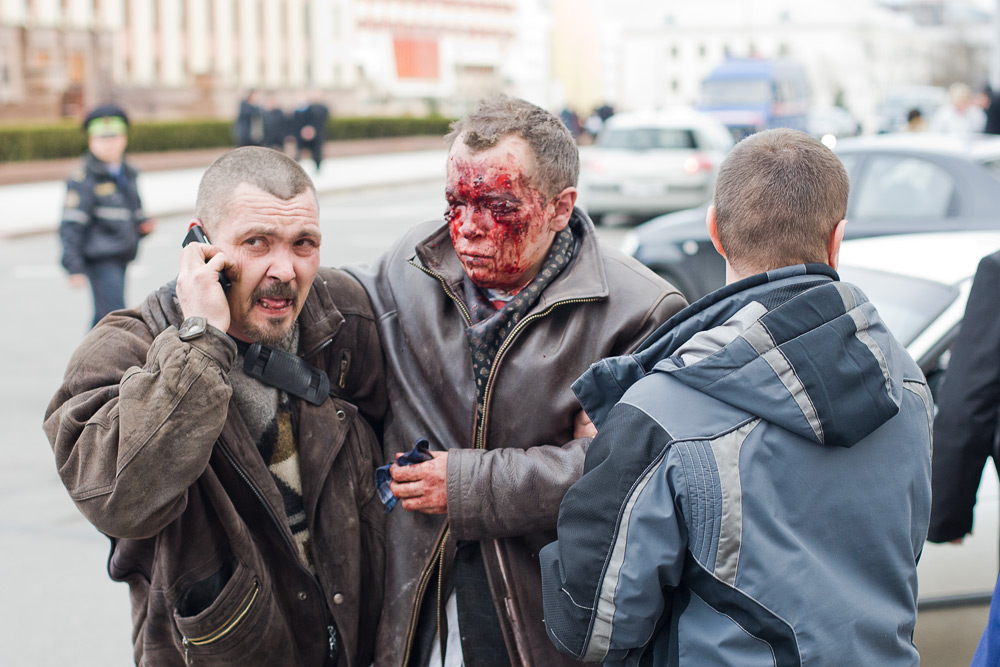
A man injured in the blast

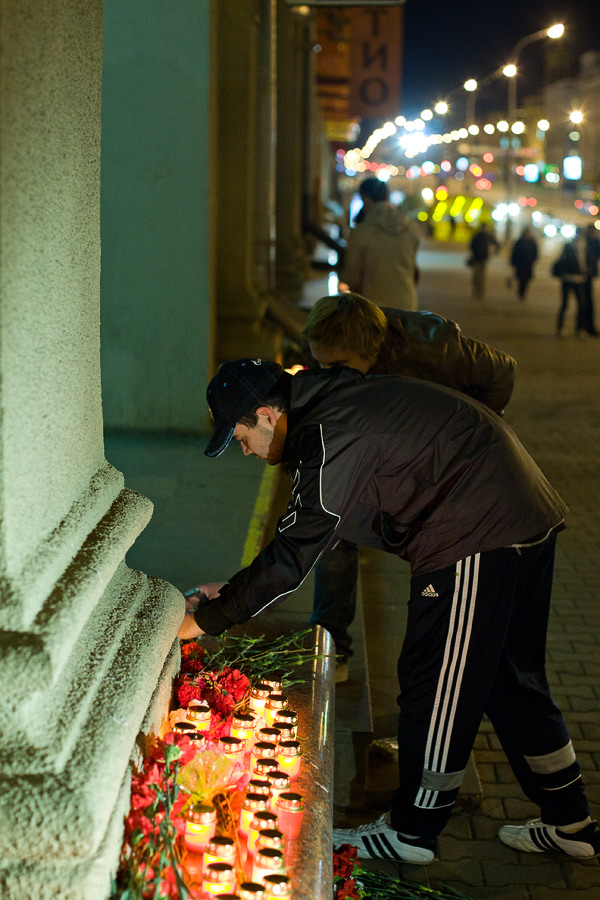
People commemorating the victims in Minsk

The explosion happened at 17:55 during evening rush hour at Kastryčnickaja station of the Minsk Metro. Like nearly every station in Minsk, Kastryčnickaja has an island platform, and during the explosion, trains were located on both tracks. According to the initial investigation, the bomb was located under a bench next to the inbound (Instytut Kultury-bound) tracks. The bomb exploded next to the second car of an inbound train. At the moment of the explosion, there were approximately 300 people in the station and an outbound (Uruchye-bound) train passed through the area without stopping. According to witnesses, there was "a flash and a bang" as passengers exited a train which had arrived at the station. The bomb was reported to have been packed with nails and ball-bearings and could have been detonated by remote control. The explosion carved a hole 80 cm in diameter. It was so powerful that it shook trains at the adjacent stations Pl. Lenina and Pl. Pobedy. The blast was equivalent to five to seven kilograms of TNT.

According to Interfax, the bomb was partially composed of fragments of metal. Most of the injuries from the blast were caused by shrapnel. It is believed that the explosive device was radio-controlled and that the bomb was of advanced technical quality. Interior Minister Anatoly Kuleshov said the perpetrators sought to "kill as many people as possible."

=== Aftermath ===
The wounded were admitted to five hospitals in Minsk. Among the injured, 32 were in a serious condition; three of them died in the hospital. Another 30 suffered injuries of moderate severity. Eight foreign citizens were among those injured.

Nationality	Killed	Injured
Belarus	15	307
Russia	0	5
Armenia	0	1
Turkmenistan	0	1
Ukraine	0	1
Total	15	315

A national day of mourning was declared for 13 April 2011. Black ribbons were attached to flags, and all entertainment events cancelled.

Like all metros built during the Soviet period, the Minsk Metro contains many artistic elements such as stylised lighting and decorative ceilings. In his speech following the explosion, the president suggested that the design of Kastryčnickaja station may have worsened the injuries. "The metro should be decorated in a way so that nothing will fall onto people's heads," Lukashenko said. "Not only from the blast. People also received injuries from objects that fell from the ceiling."

Following the attack, the Interior Ministry began installing metal detectors at all stations.

== Investigation ==
President Lukashenko asserted that the explosion was aimed at undermining "peace and stability" and hinted at possible foreign involvement but also ordered an emergency investigation of domestic weapon storage facilities. A thorough investigation into the explosion was ordered. "There should be results every day. Work day and night," Lukashenko told the Belarus security apparatus. He urged Belarusian security officials to get in touch with Russian security to aid in the investigation due to their experience with terrorist attacks in the Moscow Metro.

The president said "We have been thrown a serious challenge. It requires an adequate response and it must be found. They will not let us have a peaceful life, I want to know – who". He made an appeal to the Belarusian population to assist in the apprehension of the perpetrators: "I would like to address the people honestly and openly: without you it will be difficult for us to find these monsters. You must help us." He also ordered the full transparency of the investigation and the full availability of information to the citizens.

The Belarusian State Security Committee announced that they would pay anyone who had photos or videos of the attack. The opposition newspaper Nasha Niva provided certain material.

Three residents of Minsk were detained "for spreading provocative rumors, sowing panic". These people were alleged to be spreading false information about the bombing on Internet forums and social networking sites.

=== Arrests ===
Several people were arrested on 12 April and the facial composite of the bomber was released. Three possible motives of the terrorist attack were being investigated: as a destabilisation attempt, the action of an extremist anarchist organisation and the action of an unhealthy person. Following the arrests, the third motive was now considered the correct one, that the attack was an act of an unhealthy person. Through cooperation with Interpol, fingerprint evidence provided by the Belarusian Interior Ministry matched the fingerprints of the perpetrator of the Metro attack with prints from the Independence Day bombing in 2008. According to the investigation, the bomb was unique and the foreign investigators also expressed great interest in it.

Lukashenko declared that they may have knowledge into who "ordered the attack". He also claimed they had admitted their guilt and described the investigation by the police and the Belarusian State Security Committee as a "brilliant operation". He claimed that they admitted they were also guilty for the Vitebsk and Independence Day attacks. He also said their motives remained unclear. It was reported that psychiatrists interviewed the prime suspect and that he said that he "enjoyed the suffering of others" and did not claim any political motives. However, they considered him sane.

Two of the arrested suspects were Uladzislau Kavalyou and Dzmitry Kanavalau. Kavalyov was born and raised in Vitebsk by a single mother and moved to Minsk in 2010 where he got a job. On 10 April 2011 Kavalyov's friend Dzmitry Kanavalau came to Minsk to meet a girl he had met online. Kanavalau worked at a tractor factory in Vitebsk. Kanavalau rented an apartment in Minsk between 10 and 13 April 2011, which Kavalyov shared with him for those three days.

=== Controversies ===
Initial scepticism about the official version of events pointed out that there are no significant ethnic or religious divides in Belarus, nor any history of violent political opposition. Moreover, most of Lukashenko's opponents were either in prison or under surveillance by the Belarusian KGB. Andrei Soldatov, an analyst at Agentura.Ru, opined that organising and executing the bombing required specialised training and that "In Belarus there is no opposition group that has that kind of experience. Indeed, there doesn't seem to be anyone at all capable of doing that, if we exclude the authorities."

The day after the bombing, president Lukashenko suggested that it might be linked to the Independence Day bombing three years earlier. The very next day, the two suspects had confessed to as much.

The UN Security Council issues a standard statement whenever a UN member country suffers a terrorist attack. The choice of words in such statements are of serious importance. In this case, the United States insisted on qualifying it as an "apparent terrorist attack", and this was the first time the council has ever used such phrasing in its response to an act of terror.

== Trial and execution ==
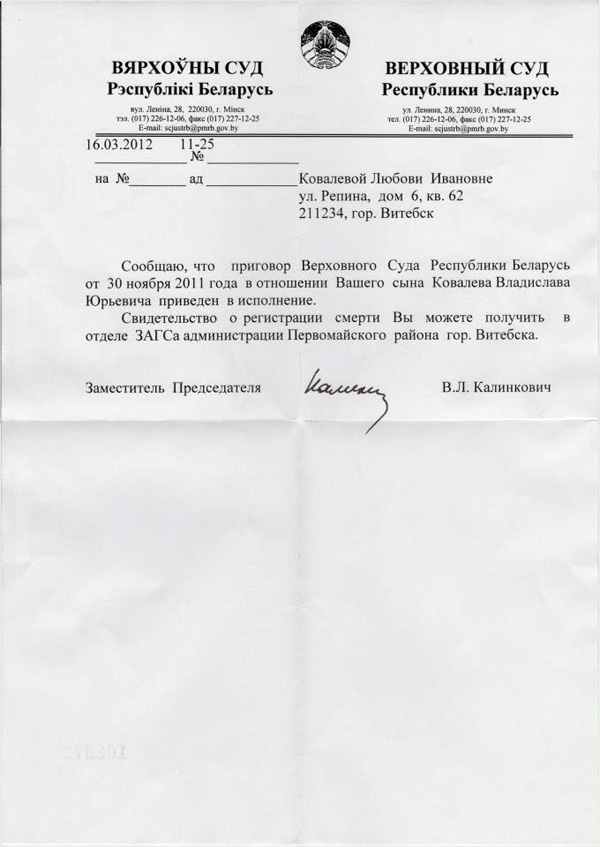
A photo of a formal letter sent to the mother of Uladzislau Kavalyou, notifying her of her son's execution.

The trial began in September 2011. Kavalyov and Kanavalau were found guilty in November.

Both Kavalyov and Kanavalau were executed by shooting sometime in early March 2012. The exact time and place of the executions of the convicts were kept secret. On 15 March 2012 the European Parliament passed a resolution condemning the Belarusian government for implementing the death penalty. The Belarusian Foreign Ministry's press service stated that the resolution indicates serious interference in the internal affairs of the country. On 17 March 2012, Kavalyou's mother was informed. She received a notification saying that her son's execution had been carried out.

== International reaction ==
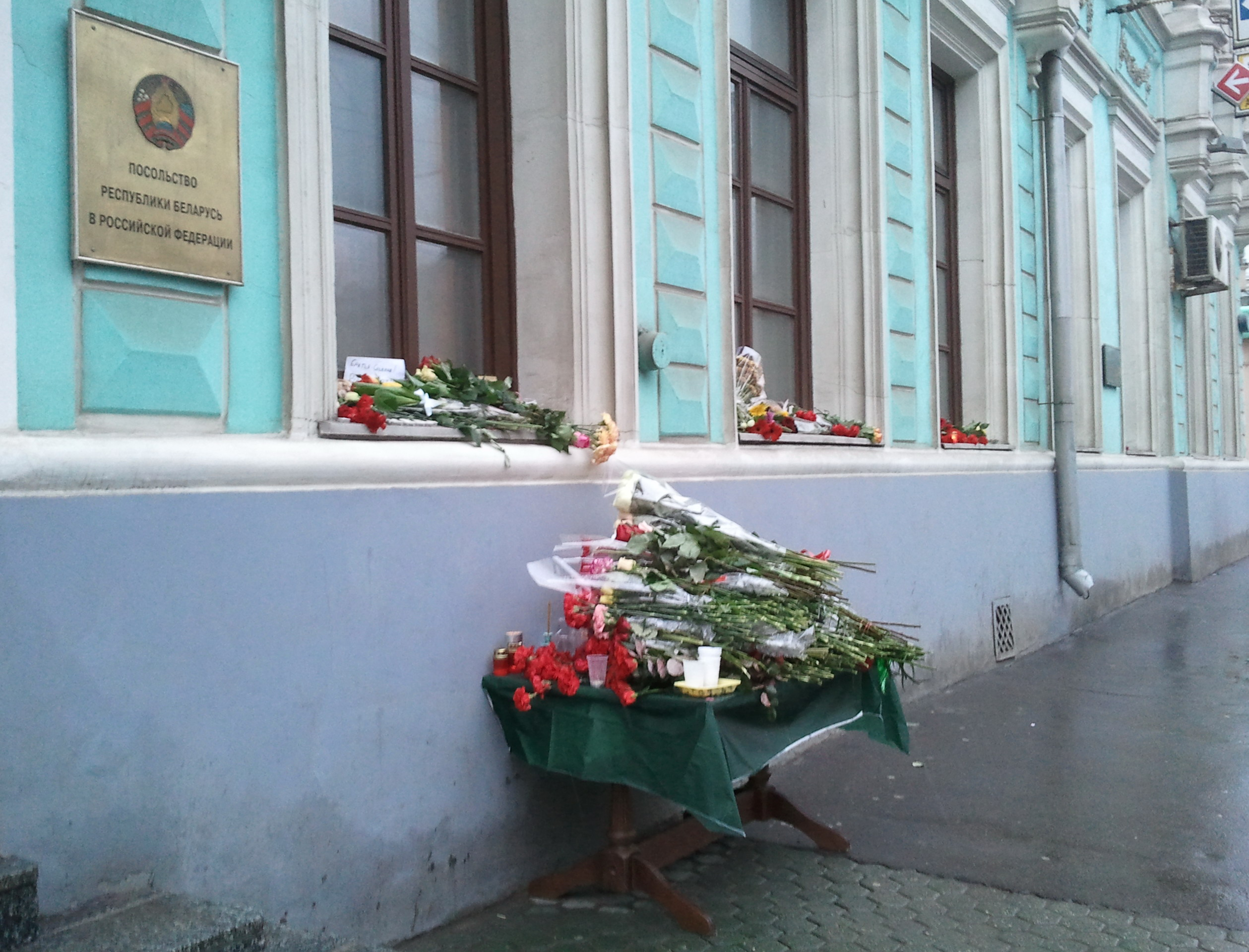
Flowers in front of the Embassy of Belarus in Moscow

Supranational bodies

- United Nations — Secretary-General Ban Ki-moon said "I do not know about the exact motives of what happened, but, as reported, it was the result of deliberate action. If so, then this is totally unacceptable and must be condemned. Whatever were the motives behind it, one can never justify the use of violent methods."
  - The Security Council issued a statement calling the incident an "apparent" terrorist attack. An anonymous diplomat from one of the 15 states on the Council said that: "The word 'apparent' is included in this statement for a reason. There are credible indications in Belarus saying there is a more than even chance that the government was behind this." Another anonymous diplomat said: "There was a lot of debate about this statement which is why it came out so late. But it just highlights international suspicions." The final statement read that "The members of the Security Council condemned in the strongest terms the apparent terrorist attack that occurred in Minsk, Republic of Belarus, on April 11, 2011, causing numerous deaths and injuries. They expressed their deep sympathy and condolences to the victims of this heinous act and to their families, and to the people and government of the Republic of Belarus."
- European Union — High Representative for Foreign Affairs and Security Policy Catherine Ashton said "I deeply regret the tragic loss of lives in the blast, which occurred yesterday. I want to express my sincere condolences and support to families of the victims and the people of Belarus". European Parliament President Jerzy Buzek expressed condolences and said "I wish a speedy and full recovery to the injured. The cause of the blast must be fully investigated".
- Organization for Security and Co-operation in Europe — Chairperson-in-Office Audronius Ažubalis expressed condolences.
- CSTO — Secretary General Nikolay Bordyuzha expressed condolences.

State officials

- Armenia — President Serzh Sargsyan sent condolences and expressed readiness to organize the treatment of victims in hospitals in Yerevan.
- Azerbaijan — President Ilham Aliyev stated "I am deeply shocked with the news about the numerous human casualties in the terrorist act in the Minsk metro. We strongly condemn terrorism in all its forms and manifestations. On behalf of the people of Azerbaijan and on my own behalf I express our sincere condolences to you, family and friends of the victims, and all the people of Belarus."
- China — Foreign Ministry Spokesman Hong Lei said that China strongly condemns the attack and that "China supports the efforts of the Belarusian leadership to combat terrorism".
- Estonia — President Toomas Hendrik Ilves sent a letter of condolence to President Lukashenko which said "I am shocked by the tragic events in the Minsk metro. At this difficult time, our thoughts are with the Belarusian people."
- France — A statement from the Foreign Ministry described the incident only as an "explosion".
- Georgia — Press secretary of the President of Georgia Manana Manjgaladze said that "The president and all Georgian people deeply sympathise with relatives and friends of those killed during the terrorist attack in Minsk".
- Israel — Foreign Minister Avigdor Lieberman expressed his condolences.
- Kyrgyzstan — First Deputy Prime Minister Omurbek Babanov said that the "terrorist attack in Belarus will not affect the decision of Kyrgyzstan to join the Customs Union of Russia, Belarus and Kazakhstan".
- Latvia — President Valdis Zatlers expressed condolences to the people of Belarus in the wake of the explosion, particularly expressing his concern for those who were injured or killed in the event and expressed hope that those who were hurt would soon get better. Foreign Minister Ģirts Valdis Kristovskis offered his condolences to the Foreign Minister of Belarus and to the people of Belarus.
- Lithuania — President Dalia Grybauskaitė, Prime Minister Andrius Kubilius, Seimas Speaker Irena Degutienė and Foreign Minister Audronius Ažubalis expressed their condolences by the name of the Lithuanian nation and condemned the violence in Belarus. Lithuania also offered to give free treatment in its resorts to all injured people.
- Moldova — Acting President Vlad Filat said "This tragedy, I firmly believe, should serve as a further consolidation of the countries in combating terrorism in all its manifestations in the name of peace and tranquility of all people of goodwill".
- Poland — Ambassador of Poland to Belarus Leszek Szerepka quoted the Foreign Minister as saying "Let me express my deep sympathy to the families of those killed and to the brotherly people of Belarus".
- Russia — President Dmitry Medvedev expressed his condolences. He also expressed his hope that law enforcement agencies "will trace down the masterminds of the crime" and that "we will help Belarus", further adding that "The Belarusian authorities should take much effort to rehabilitate the general moods after the terrorist act." Prime Minister Vladimir Putin expressed his condolences and said "On behalf of the Russian government and myself, I extend deepest condolences. We know firsthand the meaning of such actions. Our sincere sympathy goes from the heart. We like no other, empathise with the fraternal Belarusian nation in its grief. We hope for a speedy full recovery of all injured people. You can count on any help and assistance from our side, including in the investigation of the incident".
  - Patriarch of Moscow and all Rus', Kirill addressed Belarusians with words of support and condolences. The Ministry of Health and Social Development of Russia sent a team of doctors.
- Tajikistan — President Emomalii Rahmon said "We condemn this act of violence and pledge to support all efforts to eradicate terrorism".
- Turkmenistan — President Gurbanguly Berdimuhamedow expressed his condolences.
- Ukraine — President Viktor Yanukovych stated "Together with the friendly people of Belarus we share the pain of those who lost loved ones. On behalf of the Ukrainian people and me personally, I express my sincere words of sympathy and support to families of the victims and I wish a speedy recovery to all injured".
- United Kingdom – Minister for Europe David Lidington stated that he was "deeply shocked and saddened by the casualties and loss of life" and that the United Kingdom "utterly condemns all such actions, and our thoughts are with all of those affected by this tragic event."
- United States – The State Department condemned the bombing but notably did not term it terrorism.
- Uzbekistan — President Islam Karimov sent his condolences to the President of Belarus and said "With deep sorrow we took the news of the inhuman terrorist attack. I express my sincere condolences and ask you to convey our sympathy to relatives and friends of those killed and injured".
- Venezuela — President Hugo Chávez expressed his condolences.
- Vietnam — President Nguyễn Minh Triết expressed his condolences: "Vietnam is outraged and strongly condemns this terrorist act and is very confident that the culprits will be severely punished by law".

The Ministry of Foreign Affairs of Belarus received condolences from the Foreign Ministers of Georgia, Kyrgyzstan, Nicaragua, Poland, Ukraine, Finland, Estonia and Japan on 12 April. On 13 April condolences came from the Foreign Ministers of Germany, Turkey, Iran, Italy and Russia. The President's office also received condolences from leaders of Turkey, Slovakia and Cuba.

Political reaction

Political interests outside of Belarus have questioned the official version of events as well as the investigation and court proceedings, repeatedly calling for Belarus to pardon those convicted as well as abolishing the death penalty. According to the EU the investigation was not properly conducted and subsequently the trial not conducted on legal grounds. This point of view has even led the German Parliament to officially question the objectivity of the international investigation, accusing Interpol of willfully acquiescing to the "faulty" evidence provided by Belarusian investigators.

=== International aid ===
The press service of the Belarusian president reported that Israel, Russia and the United Kingdom offered to help in the investigation. Russian President Dmitry Medvedev also offered all necessary assistance in the investigation of the incident. President Lukashenko responded in saying that the help must not be rejected under any circumstances. Subsequently, the Interior Ministry announced that the explosive specialists from these three countries would arrive in Minsk during the following day. Georgia and Iran also proposed to send all needed aid to Belarus.

On 12 April 2011, a team of three Israel Defense Forces Medical Corps doctors departed for Belarus in order to assist in the efforts following the subway attack. Leading the team was the head of the Medical Corps' trauma department, Alon Galzberg. The team began operations by examining the steps needed to be taken, while advising local authorities on trauma and post-trauma procedures. The team was dispatched following a formal request by the Belarusian Government. Israel also sent an expert team of Shin Bet specialists as well as a police forensic team and experts in the field of combating terror.

== See also ==
- List of massacres in Belarus
- Capital punishment in Belarus
