= Minsk railway station =

Railway station in Minsk, Belarus

Coordinates: 53.8907°N 27.5511°E

Minsk-Passazhirsky
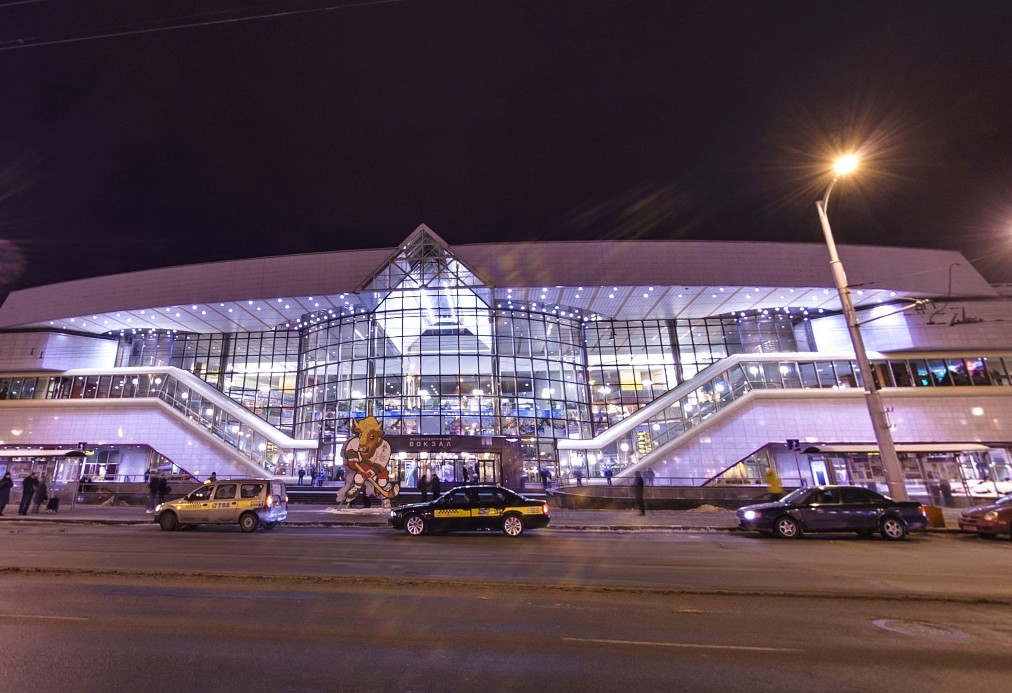
- View of the station from the street

General information
- Location: Belarus, Minsk
- System: Belarusian Railway terminal
- Owner: Belarusian Railway
- Platforms: 5 (4 island platforms)
- Tracks: 14

Construction
- Parking: yes

Other information
- Station code: 140210
- Fare zone: 0

History
- Opened: 1871

Services
Preceding station	Belarusian Railway	Following station
Location
- Location within Belarus

Minsk-Pasažyrski (Belarusian: Мінск-Пасажырскі, Russian: Минск-Пассажирский) is the main passenger railway station in Minsk, Belarus. It is located in the centre of Minsk. It is sometimes called Minsk Ploshchad Lenina due to the metro station serving the terminal, or simply Minsk.

== History ==
The station was built in 1873 as Vilen'ski vakzal, Vilnius station (Belarusian: Віленьскі вакзал Russian: Виленьский вокзал). The initial wooden building was demolished in 1890 and rebuilt in stone. During World War II, Minsk railway station was completely destroyed. It was rebuilt in 1945–1946 and served until 1991. The new building of Minsk-Passazhyrski railway station was built in 1991–2002. Its construction was delayed for financial difficulties. However, now Minsk has one of the most modern and up-to-date railway stations in the CIS.

== Traffic ==
=== National rail ===
Minsk Pasažyrski is the hub of the national passenger transport. It is also served by several international trains to Russia.

Together with the neighboring Minsk Institut Kultury railway station, it is the center of the suburban rail linking the capital to several cities and towns in the district and through the region.

=== Urban transport ===
The station is served by the Minsk Metro at the Ploshcha Lenina station (Lenin Square), part of the Maskoŭskaja line, and the Vakzaĺnaja station, part of the Zelenaluzhskaya line. The Minsk streetcar and trolleybus also operate in the area, and busses stop by at the Družnaja station.

== Trains and destinations ==
=== International ===
Train number	Train name	Destination	Operated by
001/002	Belarus	(Russia) Moscow (Belorussky)	(Belarus) Belarusian Railways
003/004		(Belarus) Brest (cars: (Belarus) Grodno) (Russia) Moscow (Belorussky)	(Belarus) Belarusian Railways
007/008		(Belarus) Brest (cars: (Belarus) Grodno) (Russia) Moscow (Belorussky)	(Russia) Russian Railways (Belarus) Belarusian Railways
027/028		(Belarus) Brest (Russia) Moscow (Belorussky)	(Belarus) Belarusian Railways
029/030	Yantar	(Russia) Kaliningrad (Russia) Moscow (Belorussky)	(Russia) Russian Railways
051/052		(Belarus) Brest (Russia) Saint Petersburg (Vitebsky)	(Belarus) Belarusian Railways
065/066		(Russia) Murmansk	(Belarus) Belarusian Railways
083/084		(Belarus) Gomel (cars: (Belarus) Grodno) (Russia) Saint Petersburg (Vitebsky)	(Belarus) Belarusian Railways
139/140		(Russia) Smolensk (cars: (Russia) Arkhangelsk)	(Belarus) Belarusian Railways
147/148		(Russia) Kaliningrad (Russia) Moscow (Belorussky)	(Russia) Russian Railways
149/150		(Russia) Samara (cars: (Russia) Nizhniy Novgorod)	(Russia) Russian Railways
249/250		(Russia) Saint Petersburg (Vitebsky) (cars: (Russia) Pskov)	(Belarus) Belarusian Railways (Russia) Russian Railways
301/302		(Russia) Adler (cars: (Russia) Mineralnye Vody)	(Belarus) Belarusian Railways
359/360		(Russia) Kaliningrad (Russia) Adler (cars: (Russia) Anapa)	(Russia) Russian Railways
425/426		(Russia) Chelyabinsk (Russia) Kaliningrad	(Russia) Russian Railways
489/490		(Russia) Anapa	(Belarus) Belarusian Railways
717/718; 721/722	Lastochka	(Russia) Moscow (Belorussky)	(Russia) Russian Railways

== Gallery ==
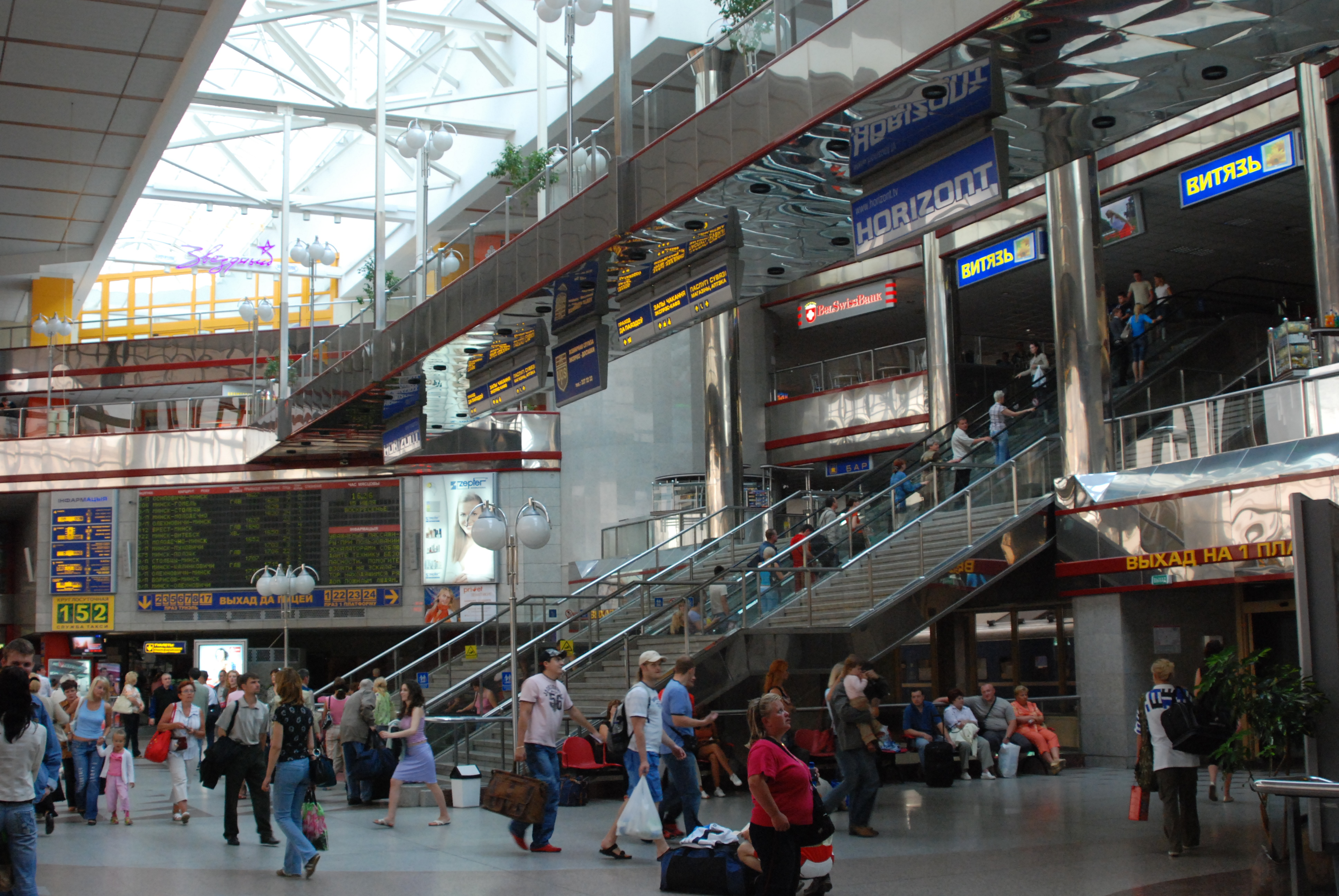
Hall of the station

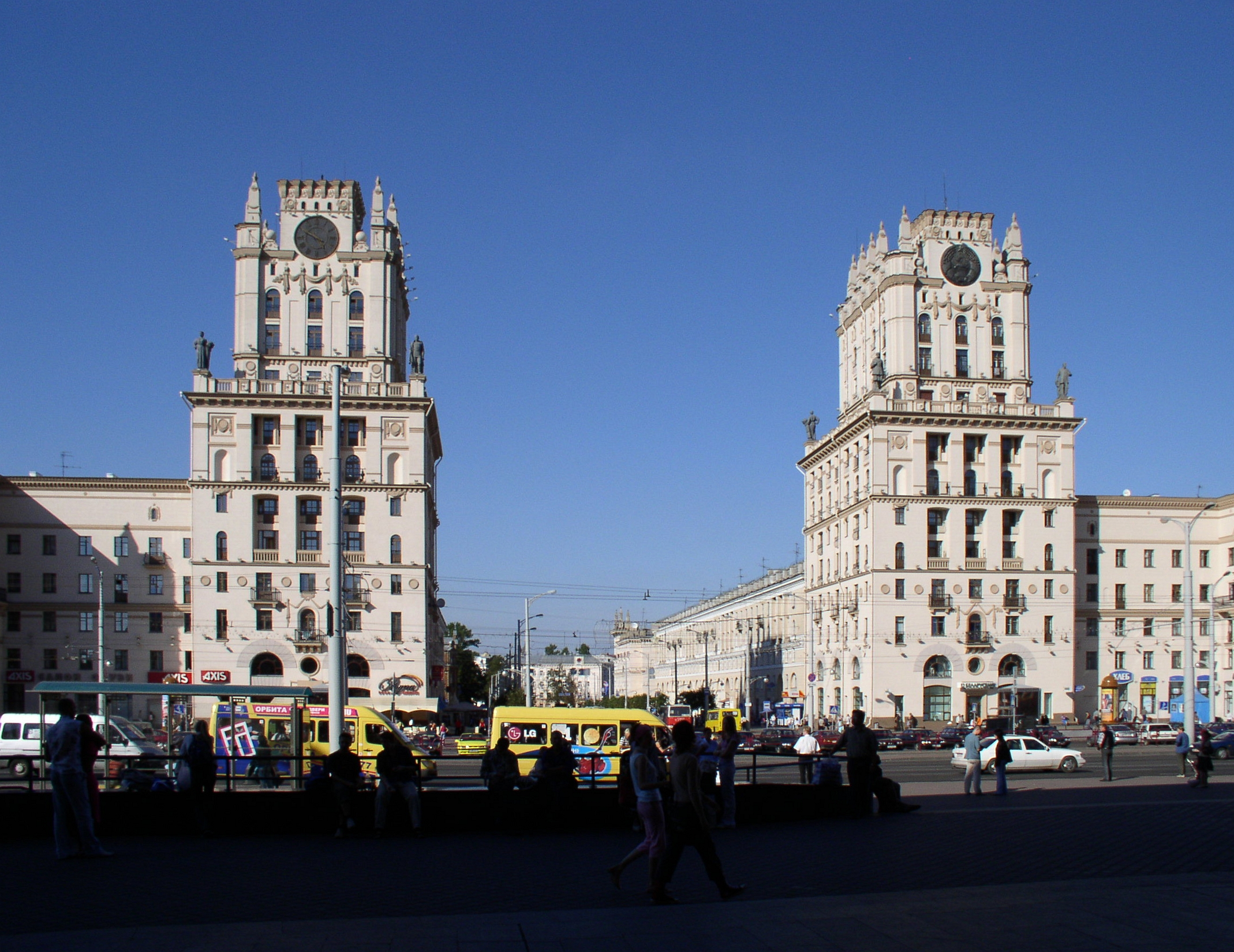
The Stalinist architecture of two buildings at the Station Square, located in front of the terminal

== See also ==
- Rail transport in Belarus
- Belorusskaja Železnaja Doroga
- Fanipol railway station, part of the suburban network
