= Kastrychnitskaya (Minsk Metro) =

Minsk Metro station

Kastrychnitskaya Кастрычніцкая
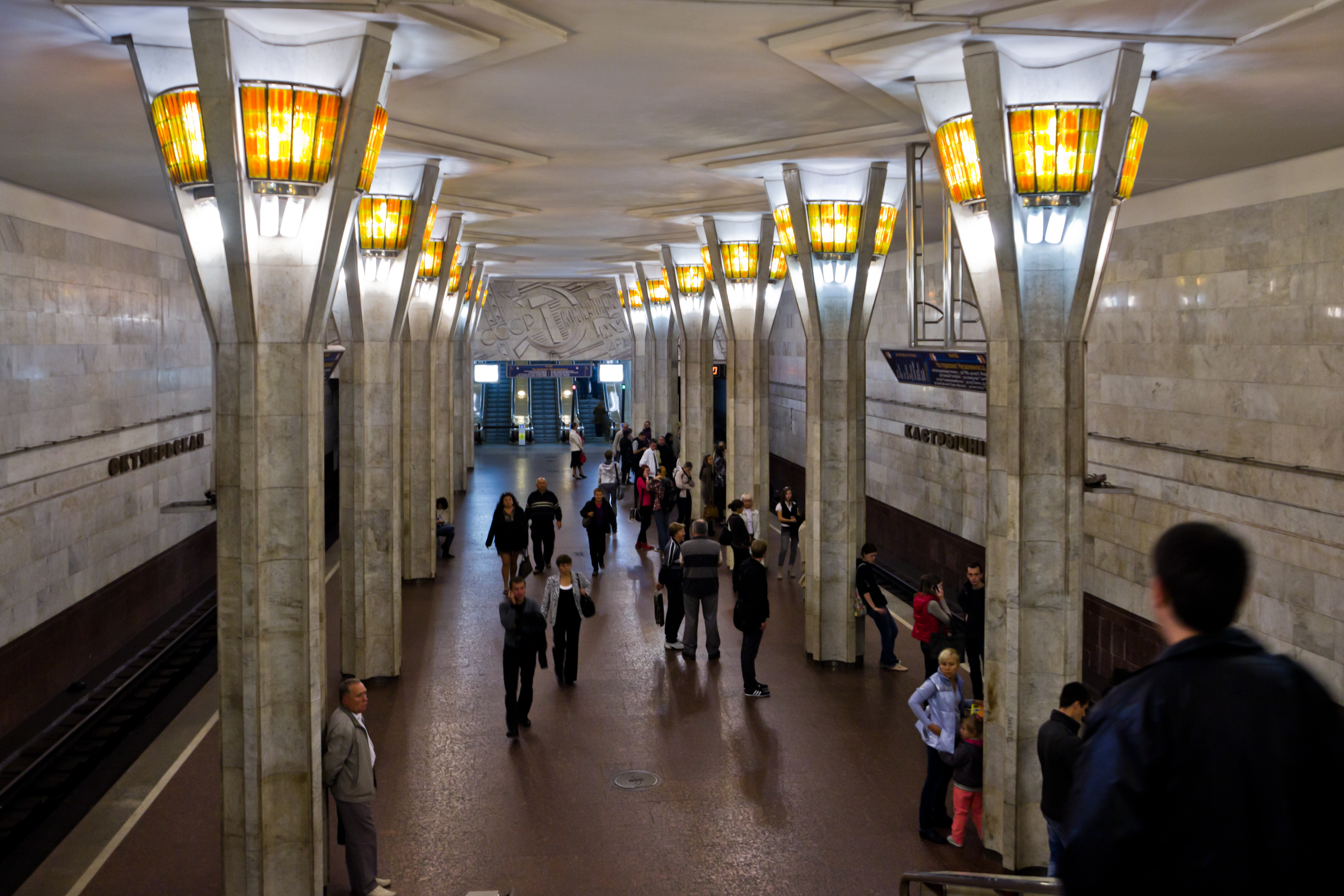
- Kastrychnitskaya (Minsk Metro)

General information
- Coordinates: 53.9019°N 27.5614°E
- System: Minsk Metro
- Owner: Minsk Metro
- Line: Maskoŭskaja line
- Platforms: 1 island platform
- Tracks: 2
- Connections: Awtazavodskaya line (Kuplawskaya)

Construction
- Structure type: Underground
- Depth: 13.4 m (44 ft)

Other information
- Station code: 116

History
- Opened: 30 June 1984; 42 years ago

Services
| Preceding station | Minsk Metro | Following station |
|---|---|---|
| Ploshcha Pyeramohi towards Uručča | Maskoŭskaja line | Ploshcha Lyenina towards Malinawka |
Transfer at Kupalawskaya
| Nyamiha towards Kamyennaya Horka | Awtazavodskaya line transfer at Kupalawskaya | Pyershamayskaya towards Mahilyowskaya |
Location
- Location within Belarus

Kastrychnitskaya (Belarusian: Кастрычніцкая, lit. 'October'; Russian: Октябрьская) or previously Oktyabrskaya, is a station of Minsk Metro in Minsk, the capital of Belarus. It opened on June 30, 1984.

The station is one of three on the Minsk Metro to have been built with an entrance in an existing building, the other two being Kupalawskaya and Ploshcha Lyenina.

== 2011 bombing ==
Kastrychnitskaya station was the site of the Minsk Metro bombing on April 11, 2011, in which 15 people were killed and 315 injured.

== Gallery ==
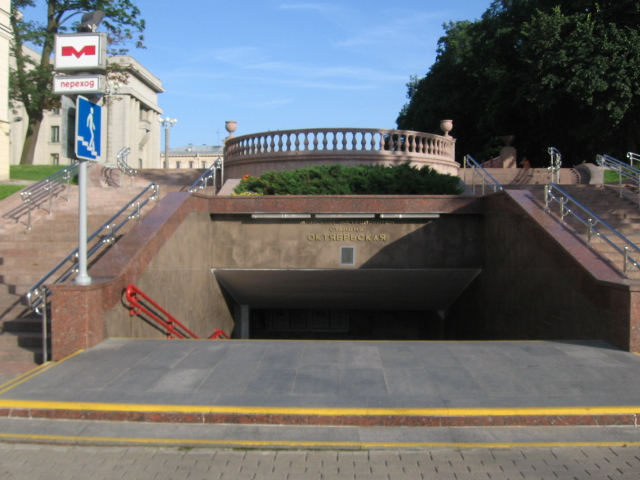

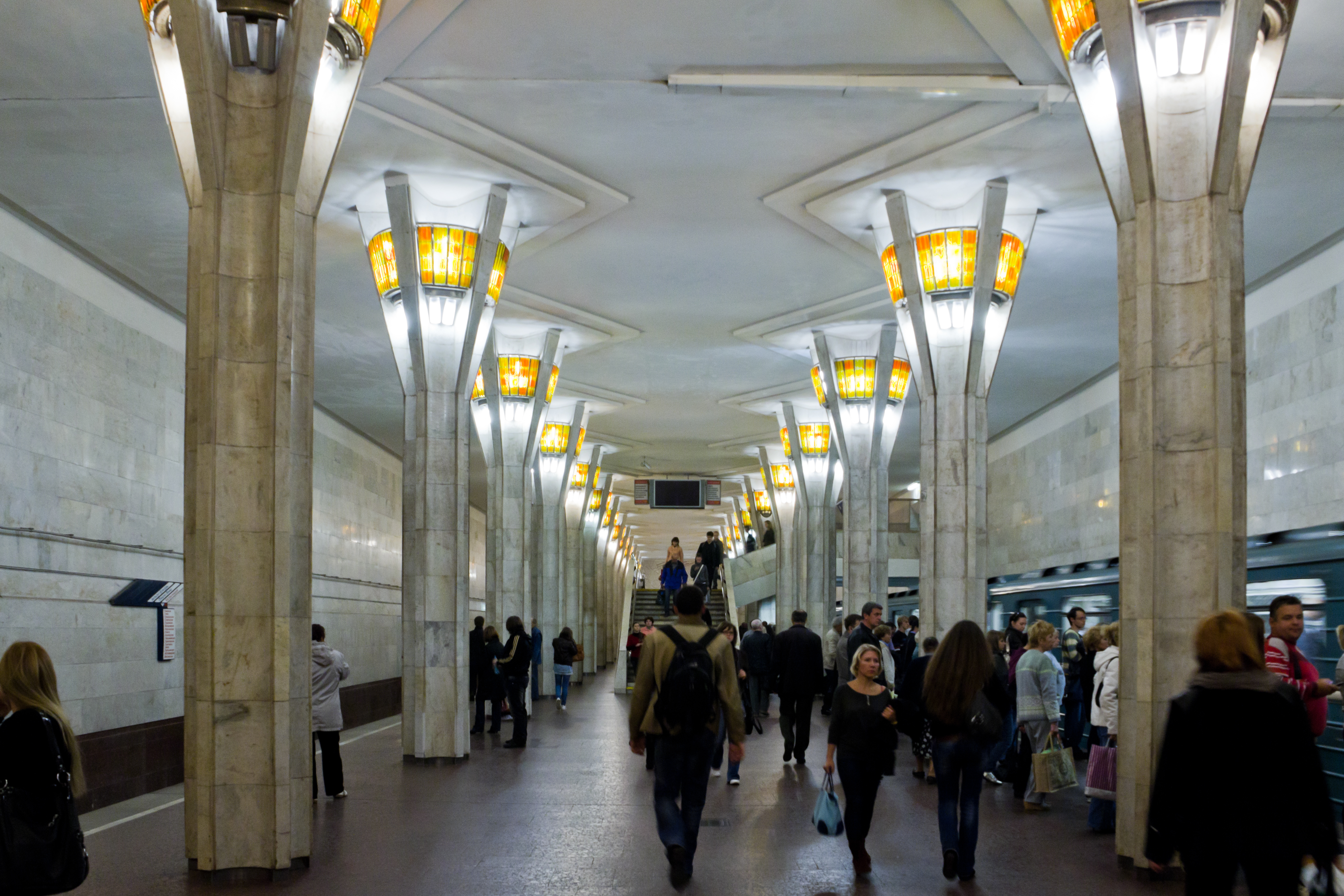

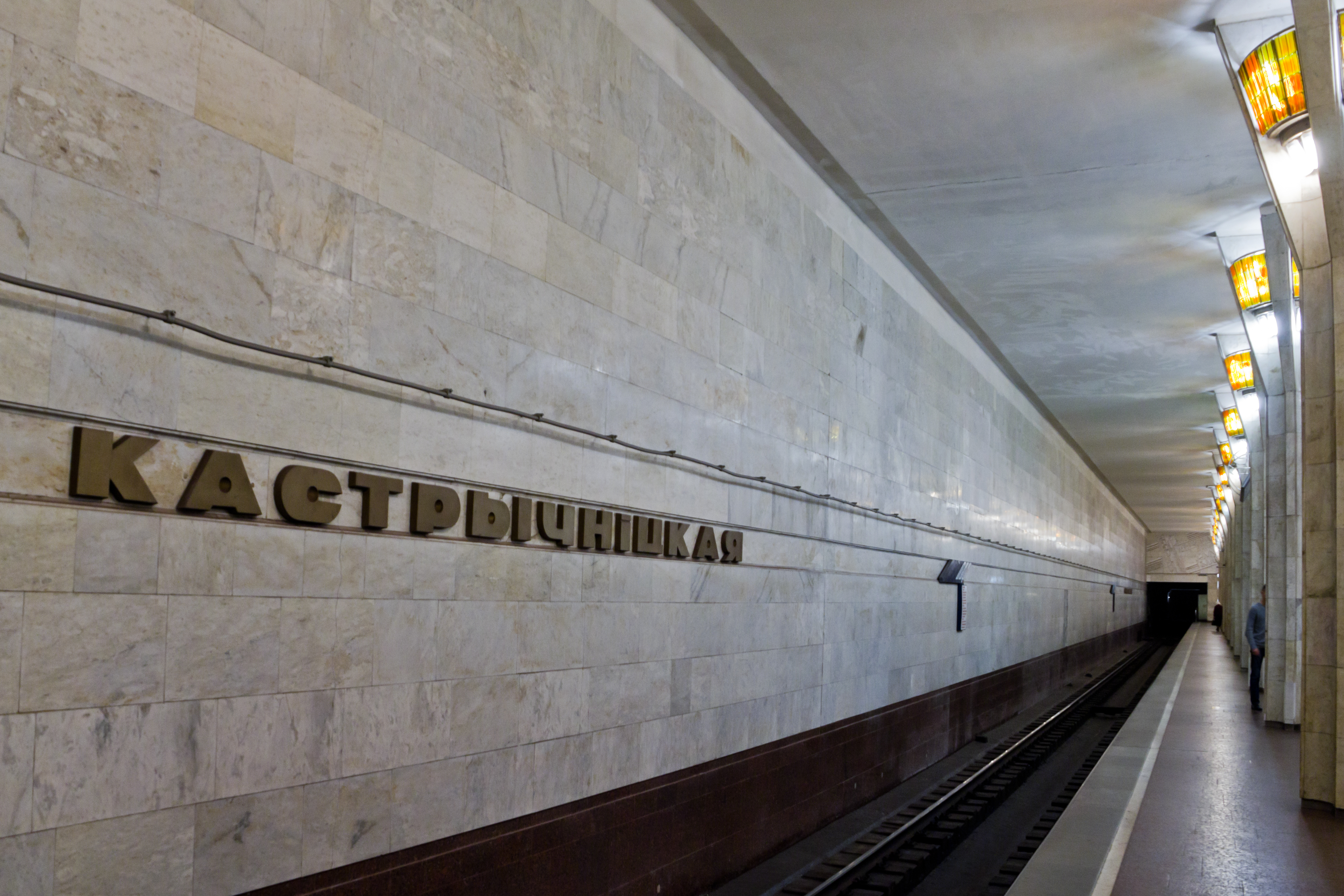

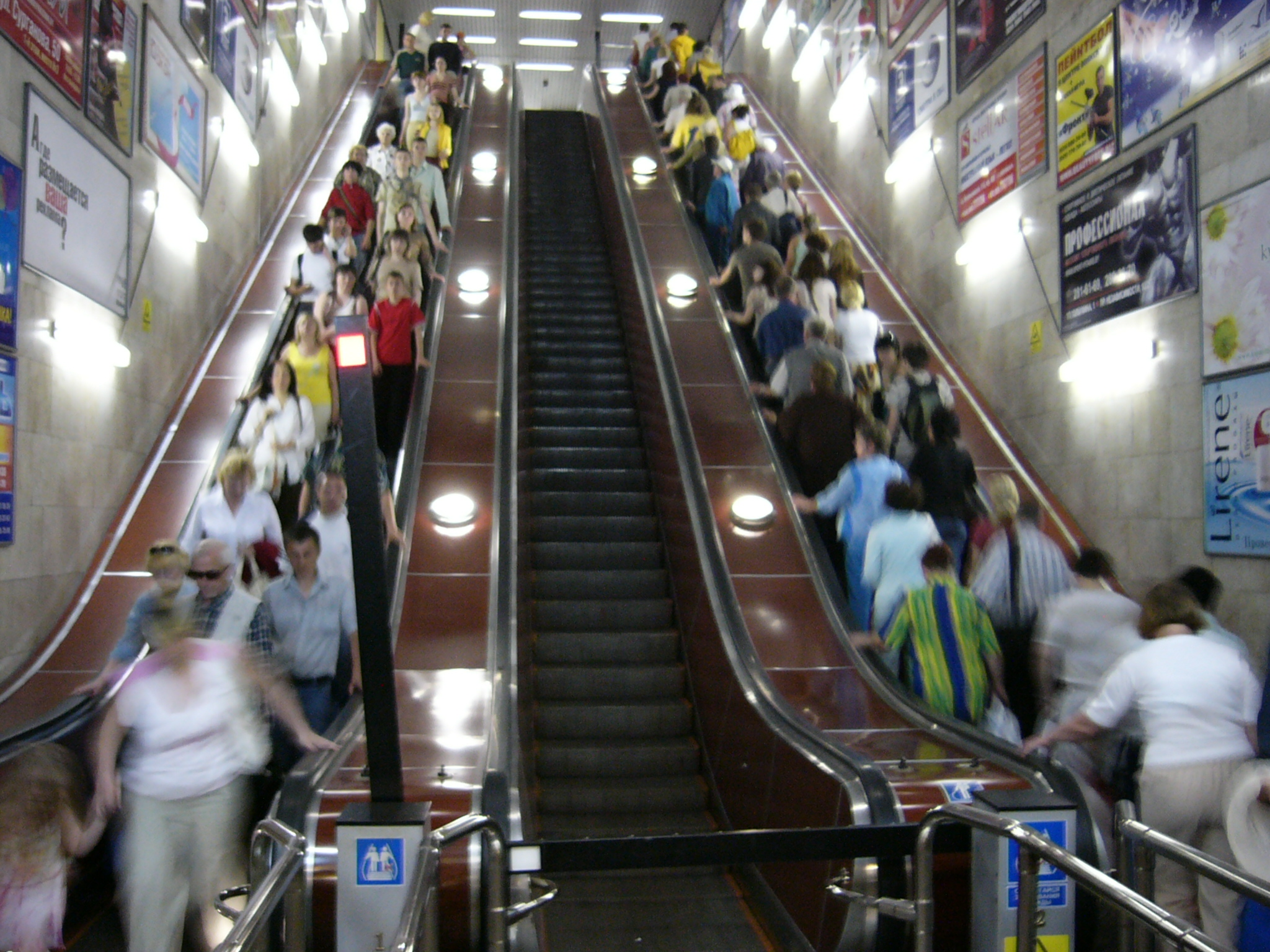

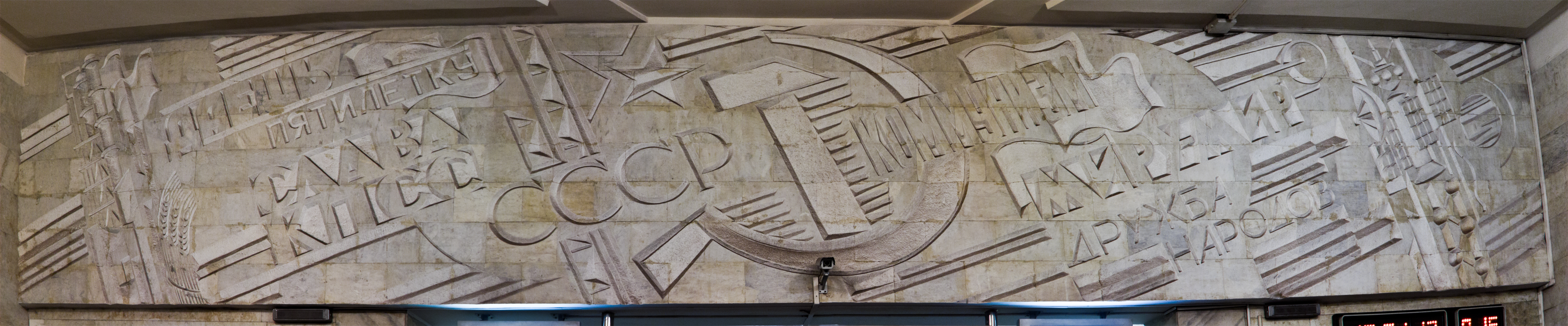

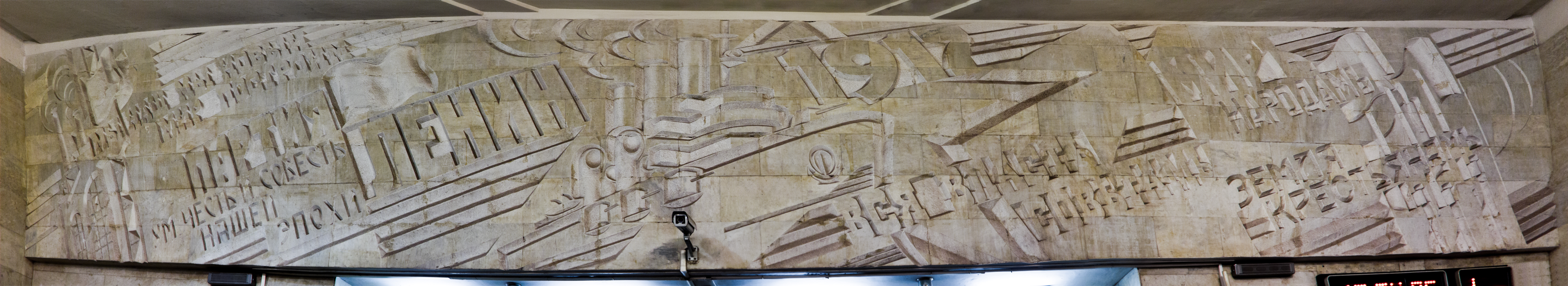

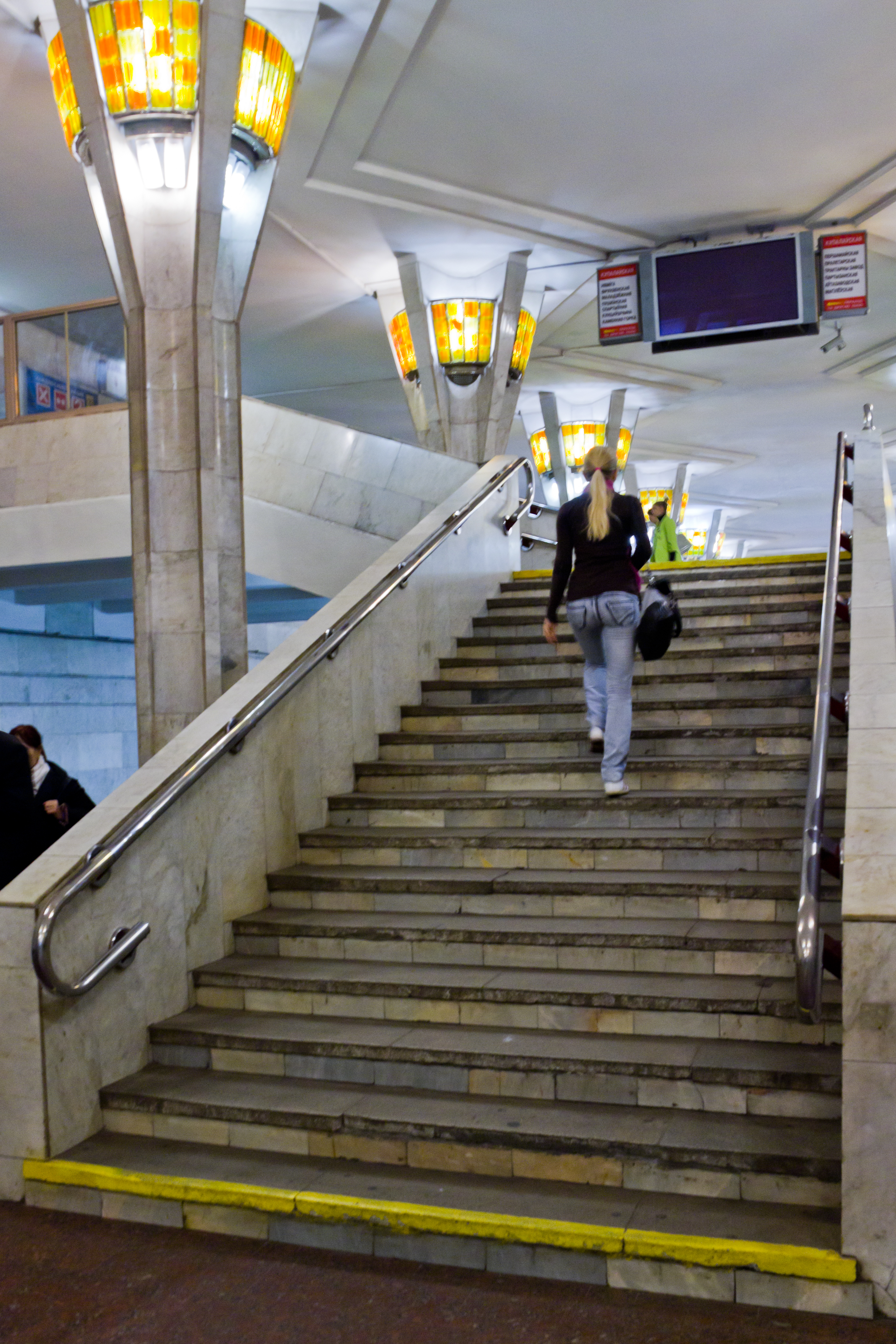

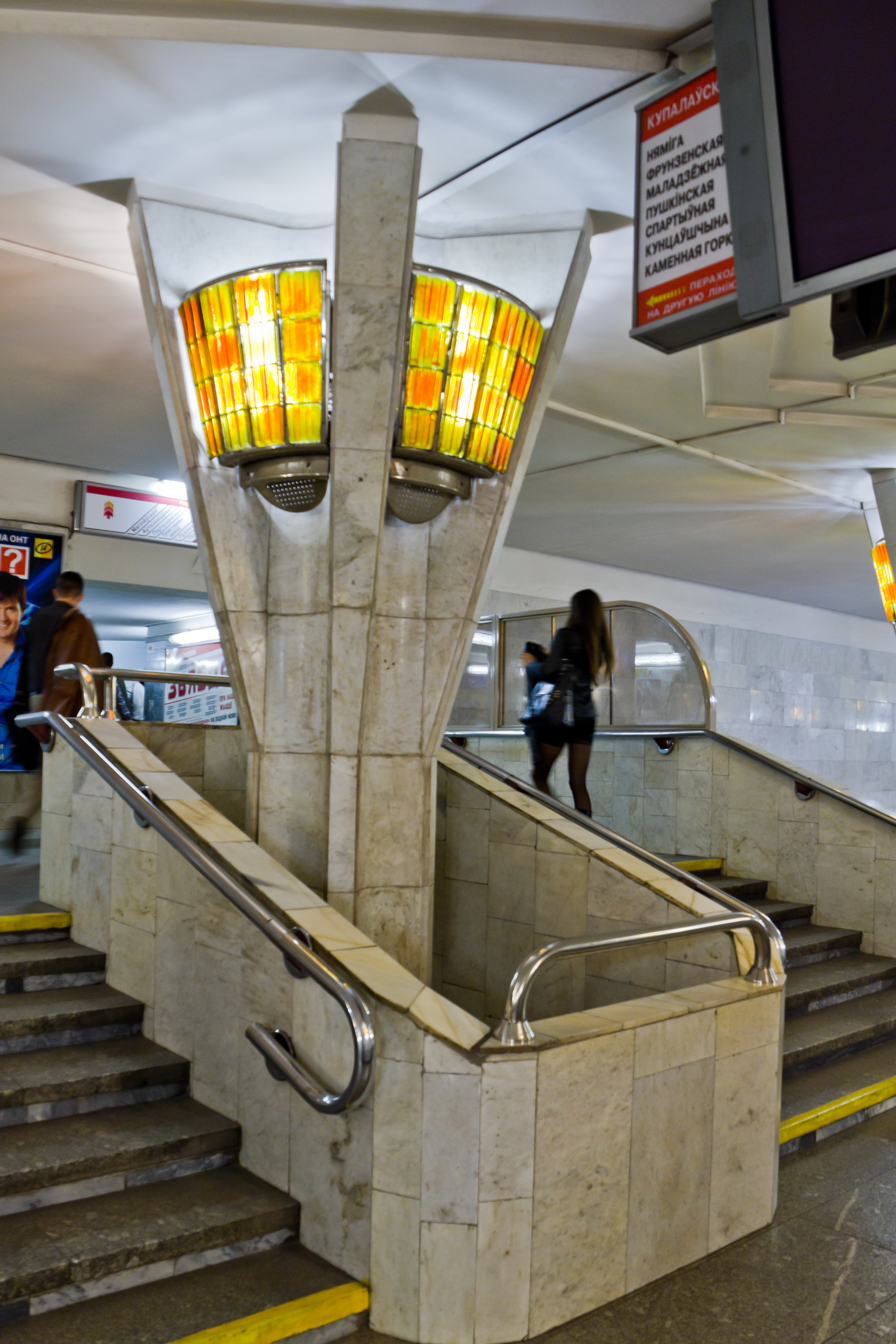
