= Ploshcha Lyenina (Minsk Metro) =

Minsk Metro station

Ploshcha Lyenina Плошча Леніна
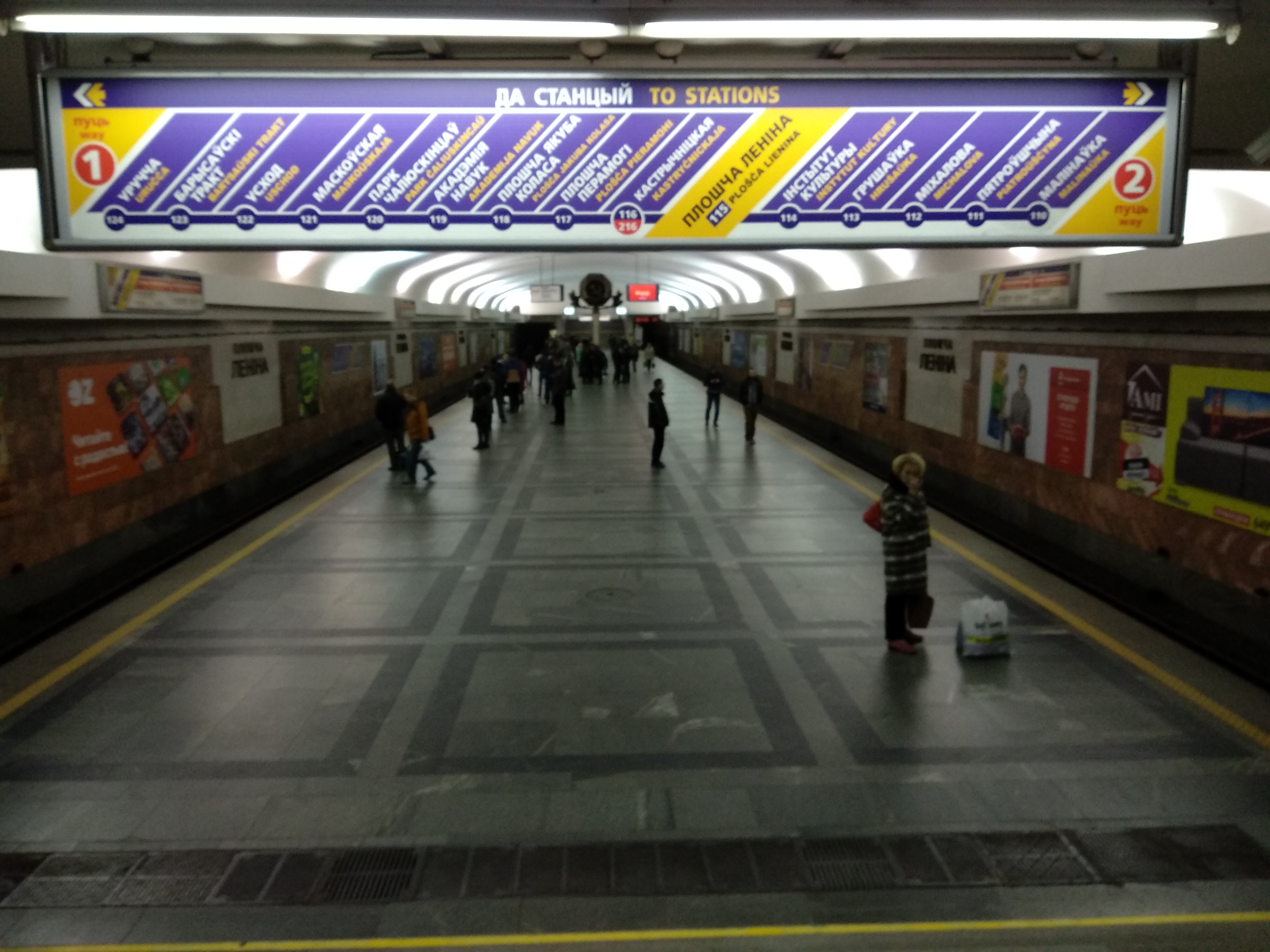
- Station Hall

General information
- Coordinates: 53.8932°N 27.5478°E
- System: Minsk Metro
- Owner: Minsk Metro
- Line: Maskoŭskaja line
- Platforms: 1 island platform
- Tracks: 2
- Connections: Zelenaluzhskaya line (Vakzaĺnaja)

Construction
- Structure type: Underground

Other information
- Station code: 115

History
- Opened: 26 June 1984; 42 years ago

Services
Preceding station	Minsk Metro	Following station
Kastrychnitskaya towards Uručča	Maskoŭskaja line	Instytut Kultury towards Malinawka
Transfer at Vakzaĺnaja
Plošča Franciška Bahuševiča towards Jubiliejnaja plošča	Zelenaluzhskaya line transfer at Vakzaĺnaja	Kavaĺskaja Slabada Terminus
Location
- Location within Belarus

Ploshcha Lyenina (Belarusian: Плошча Леніна; Russian: Площадь Ленина, romanized: Ploshchad Lenina; lit. 'Lenin Square') is a Minsk Metro station, in Minsk, the capital of Belarus.

== Overview ==
The station, opened on June 24, 1984, is part of the Maskoŭskaja line and serves the main railway station of the city, Minsk-Pasažyrski.

From 1992 to 2003, the station was called "Ploshcha Nyezalyezhnastsi" (Belarusian: Плошча Незалежнасці, lit. 'Independence Square'), but later the station's original name was restored. According to the head of the technical department of the Minsk subway, the official decision to rename the station "Lenin Square" to "Independence Square" was never taken, and was only verbal instructions from the government.

It is a transfer station to the Vakzaĺnaja station on the Zelenaluzhskaya line.

It is one of three on the Minsk Metro to have been built with an entrance in an existing building, the other two being Kastryčnickaja and Kupalaŭskaja.

== Gallery ==
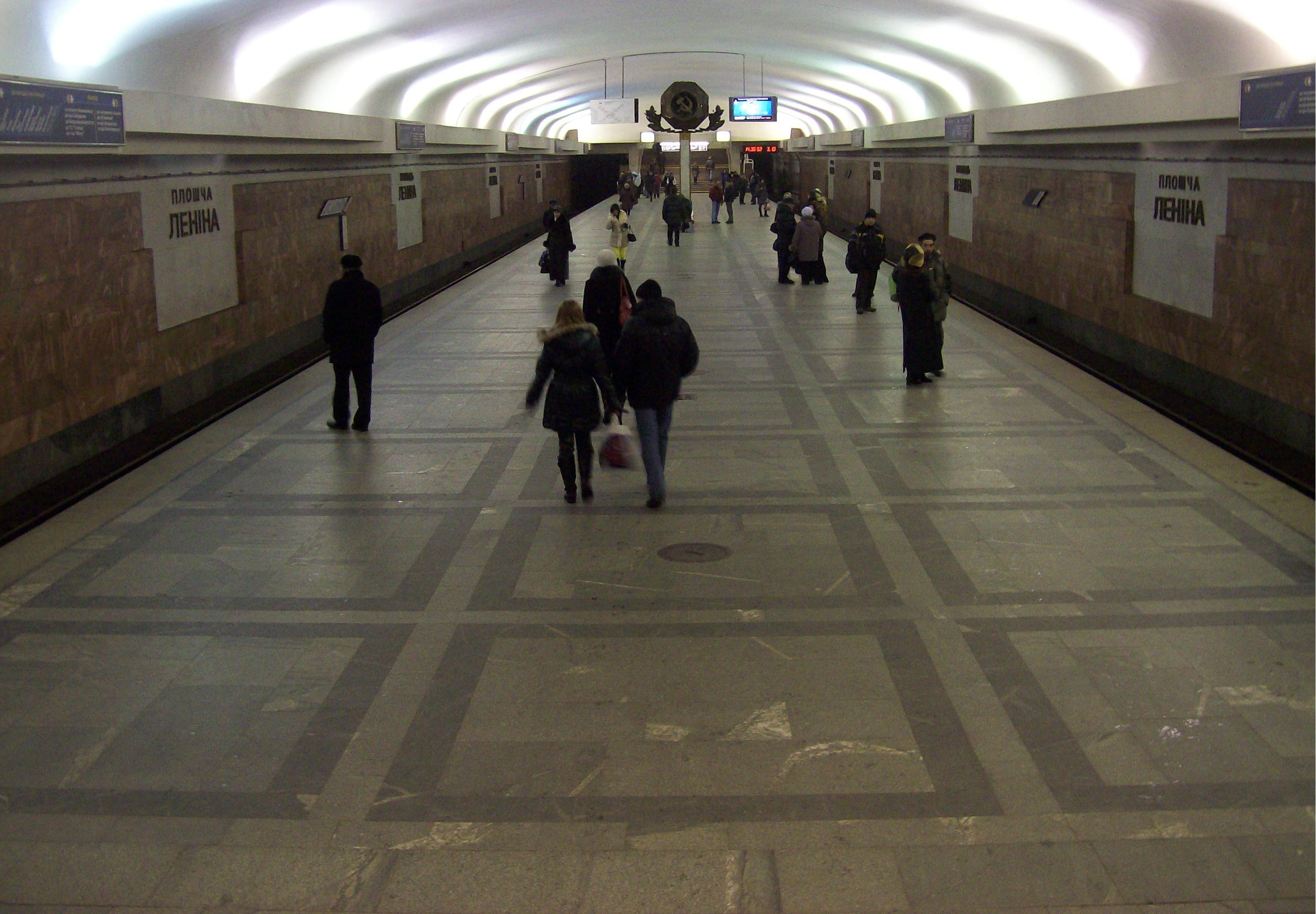

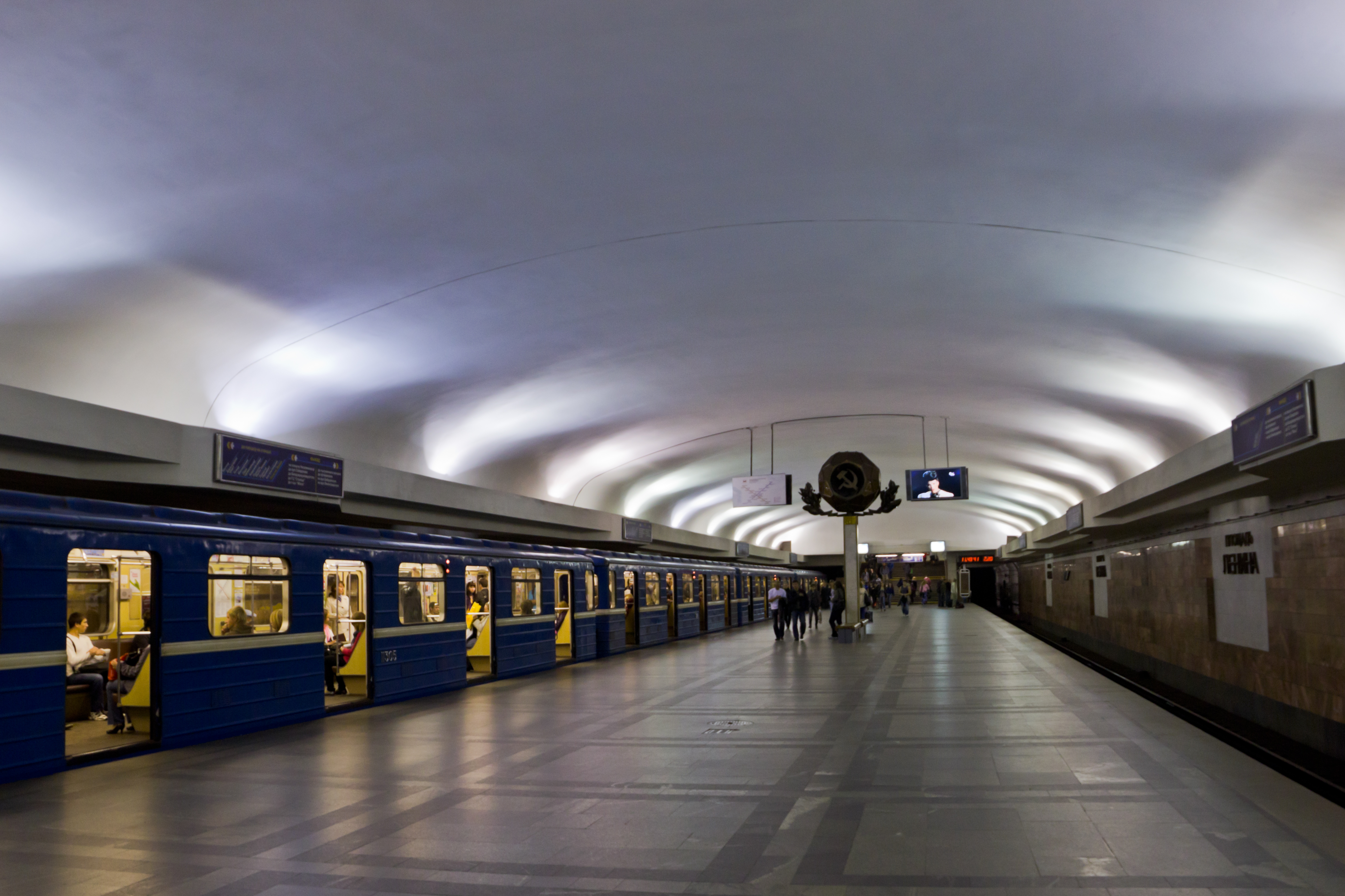

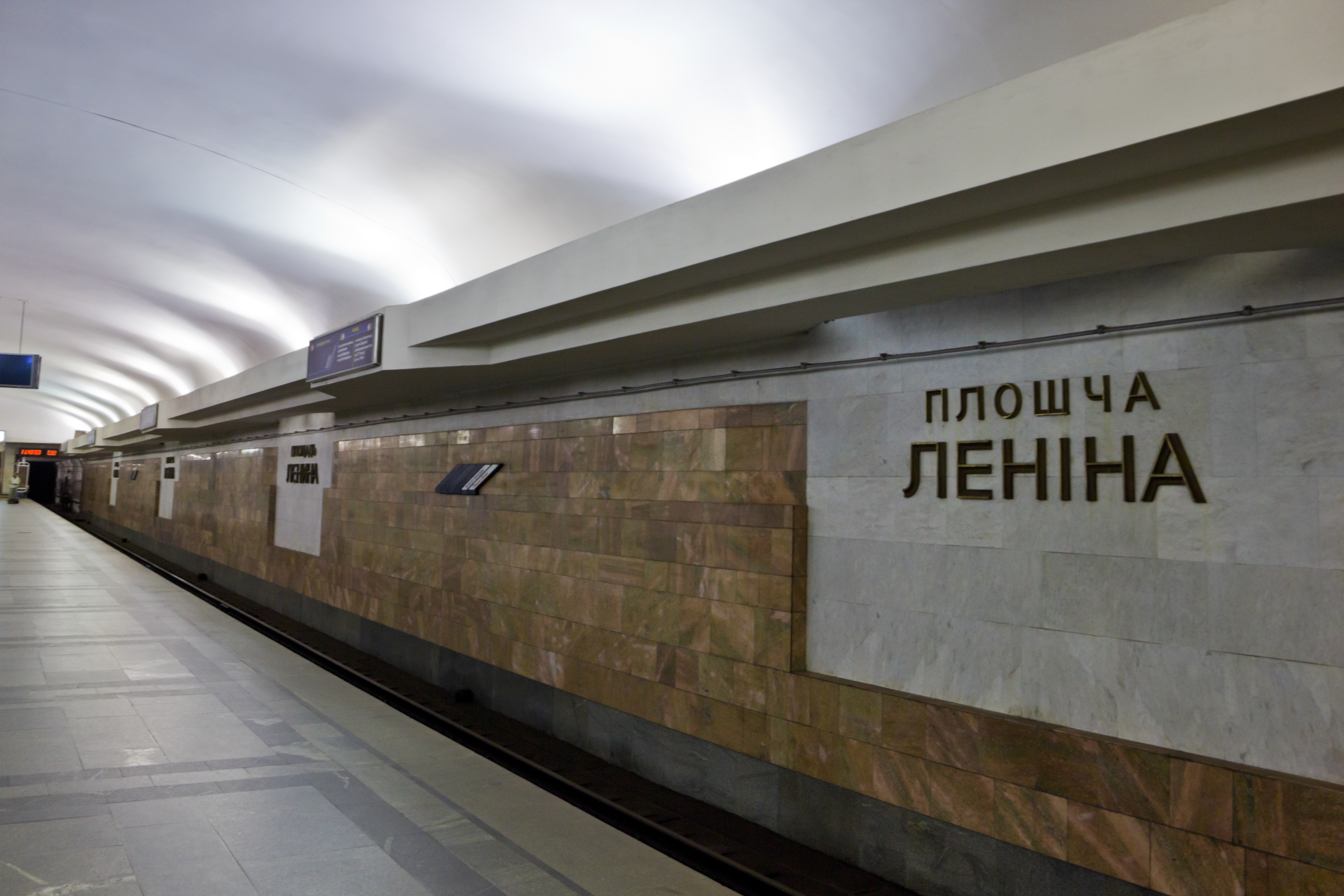

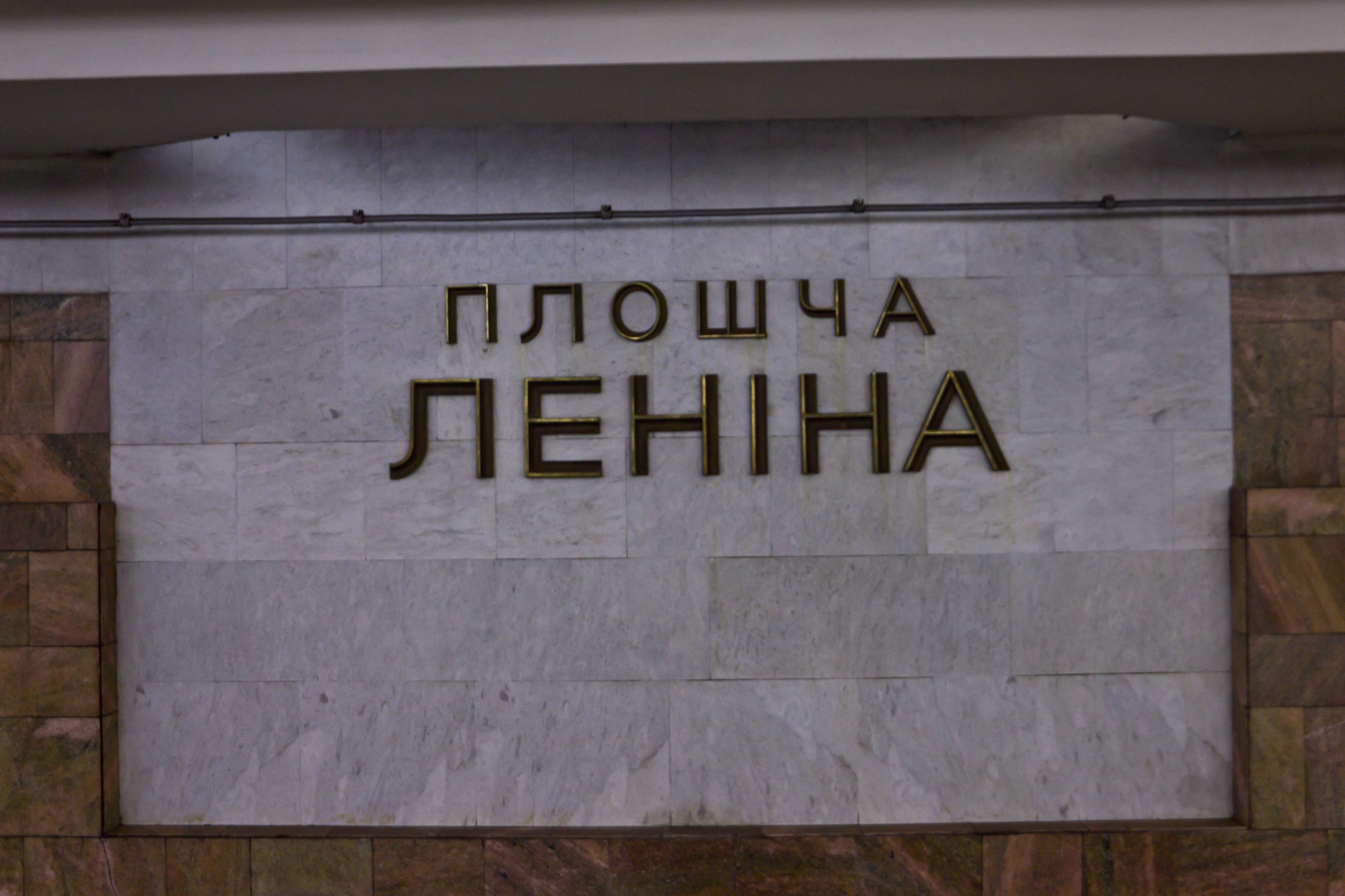

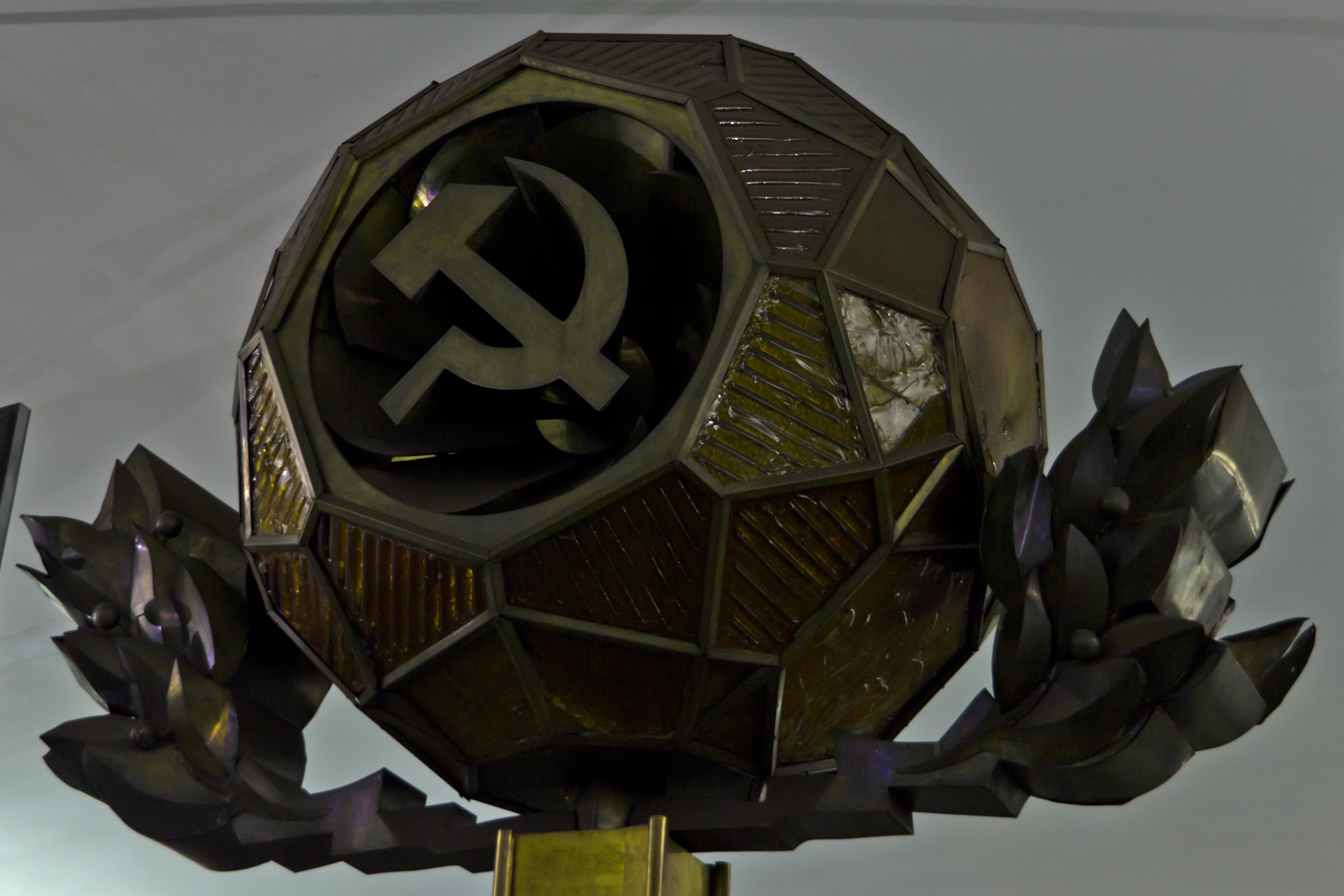
