= Čyžoŭka =

Coordinates: 53°50′23″N 27°38′12″E

Map of Čyžoŭka

Čyžoŭka (Belarusian: Чыжоўка, Russian: Чижовка) is a microdistrict in south-east Minsk between Čyžoŭskaje Reservoir and Minsk Automobile Ring Road. It is part of Zavodski District.

Minsk Zoo is located in the northern part of Čyžoŭka.

Nearest metro stations: Aŭtazavodskaja, Mahilioŭskaja.

== History ==
The name comes from the village located on this site, which in 1967 was incorporated into Minsk. The development of the area began in 1964. Consists of seven quarters: Čyžoŭka -1, Čyžoŭka -2, etc. (Čyžoŭka -7 is a private sector on Krasnaya Sloboda street.) Population - 62 thousand people. The Čyžoŭka cemetery is located outside the Minsk Ring Road.

Until the middle of the twentieth century on the site of modern Chizhovka was the village of the same name, collective farm fields and orchards. In 1951, the Chizhov Reservoir was established in Svislach to supply CHP-3 with water. On its high bank there was a settlement of a collective farm Zatishsha.

The design of the new neighborhood took place in the early 1960s, construction began in 1964 and lasted for almost ten years. According to the plans of the architects of the "Minsk State Project" - R. Artemchik, L. Arkhangelskaya, E. Zaslavskaya, A. Shelyakin - 6 "Chizhovaks" were built for 62,000 people. Between the 1st and 5th Chizhovki the old private building which has remained till now was left. In 1967, on the anniversary of the Belarusian capital, a park named after the 900th anniversary of Minsk was laid out along the Chizhovsky Reservoir. In 1969, a road bridge was built over the Svislach River, connecting Tashkentskaya and Kabushkina streets, and Chizhovka with Partyzansky Avenue. In the same year the first trolleybus with the 16th number went to the new district.

The public center of the district was located by architects between Tashkentskaya Street and Tashkentsky Proezd: it included the Druzhba cinema (1974), a public house, a polyclinic, a children's library (1982), and a market. The cinema was built according to a typical but very rarely used project of the Mezentsev Central Research Institute. In tandem with the cinema in the building there was a cafe and a dance hall. A rather original project of the library (architects Chadovich - Ladkin) received the All-Union Prize of the YMCA. The center remained unfinished - the planned "catering unit" was never built.

In the depths of Chizhovka-2 the children were greeted by the cafe "Cosmos" with fantastic interiors and even a light path, the squares of which lit up when they were stepped on.

In 1984, the zoo of the Minsk Automobile Plant, the future Minsk Zoo, appeared on the banks of the Svislach River.

Chizhovka's face has significantly changed the 2014 Ice Hockey World Championship. For its carrying out Chizhovka-Arena, hotel "Arena" have been constructed, doors of cafe "Traditions" and "Children's" have opened. Tashkentskaya Street and the bridge across the Svislach River were widened and illuminated. During the construction of the Chizhovka-Arena, the last houses of the village of Zatyshsha were demolished, the park of the 900th anniversary of Minsk was significantly thinned, paved, illuminated and decorated.

In early 2018, the buildings of the village of Korziuki were demolished, and multi-storey panel houses will be erected on the street of the same name.

== Location ==
It is located in the southeast of the city, separated from Serebryanka by the Chizhovsky reservoir. Also adjacent to the Loshitsa microdistrict, the Moscow Ring Road and the Minsk Automobile Plant. Typical "sleeping area" with the appropriate infrastructure.

== Structure (Warehouse and buildings) ==
Čyžoŭka consists of 7 microdistricts:

- Čyžoŭka 1
- Čyžoŭka 2
- Čyžoŭka 3
- Čyžoŭka 4
- Čyžoŭka 5
- Čyžoŭka 6
- Čyžoŭka 7

Chizhovka consists of 7 districts Chizhovka 1. To dilute the system of five-storey buildings along Tashkentskaya Street, 4 20-storey high-rises of the MK-9 series with attached objects of trade and social services were delivered: a children's cafe, a canteen (now the Traditions cafe), a supermarket (today's ZR, shop "Pioneer". Chizhovka 2 Chizhovka 3. In this area of Chizhovka the same principle of dilution of five-story buildings by high-rises was used. At the heart of one is a furniture store. In addition, a "house-wall" appeared along Golodzeda Street from its intersection with Tashkentskaya. Chizhovka 4 Chizhovka 5 Chizhovka 6. In 2010, the first rental house in Minsk appeared here. Chizhovka 7 Chizhovka cannot boast of a special originality of the building. More than half of the housing stock are typical panel and brick five-story buildings, placed in their mass "columns" one after another - the so-called "row building", popular in the 1960s. However, despite the small range of designs and details, the architects of the district managed to create an ensemble along the main streets of Chizhov.

== Infrastructure ==
An important place in the spatial organization of the district is occupied by the public center located at the intersection of the main streets, which includes enterprises and institutions of cultural and public services (cafe, library, clinic, house, supermarket). The Druzhba cinema, which opened in 1974, was closed in 2012 due to unprofitability and sold at auction, and was demolished in 2017. [1] As of February 2019, a shopping center is under construction on the site of the cinema.

Supermarkets of Green, Neighbors, Euroopt and Vitalur chains have also been built in Chyzhovka. A large number of schools and preschools. There are gambling clubs.

There are 2 hotels in the area:

- Hotel KADM of the BELMOTEL chain (128/2 Ubarevich Street, Minsk, 220077, Republic of Belarus);
- Three-star hotel "Arena" (15 Tashkentskaya Street, Minsk, 220077, Republic of Belarus).

A large green massif is being formed on the bank of the Chizhovsky Reservoir - the Park named after the 900th anniversary of Minsk. Between him and Tashkentskaya Street in 2010–2013. Before the World Ice Hockey Championship, a sports complex Chizhovka-Arena was built, on the corner of Tashkentskaya and Ubarevich - a three-star hotel "Arena". The Minsk Zoo is located in the north of the district, between Ubarevich Street and the Svislach River. The church of St. George the Victorious was erected between Chizhovka-6 and the reservoir.

There are currently 2 libraries:

- Library No.11 (Tashkentsky, 3, Minsk, 220077, Republic of Belarus);
- Children's Library No. 9 (44 Ubarevich Street, Minsk, 220066, Republic of Belarus).

== The streets ==
The main highways of the massif are Tashkentskaya and Goladzeda streets, which intersect at right angles. The community center of the district is formed at their crossroads. Main streets:

- Tashkentskaya is the main street of Chizhovka, in fact, an avenue. It owes its name to the Tashkent earthquake of 1966, more precisely, the help that Belarus provided to the capital of the USSR.
- Goladzeda - named after MM Goladzed, chairman of the SNC of the BSSR in 1927 - 1937.
- Ubarevich - named after IP Ubarevich, a hero of the Civil War, commander of the 5th rank.
- Krasnoslobodskaya
- Kapylskaya
- Клецкая
- Tashkent travel
- Goladze's journey
- Korziuki

Streets: Nesvizhskaya, Grodno, Avezov - named after Mukhtar Amarkhanovich Avezov, Sava Kazakh writer, playwright and scientist (1897 - 1961), Starobinskaya, Stolbtsovskaya, 1st Zarechny Lane, 2nd Zarechny Lane, 3rd Zarechny Lane River dead end, 2nd Ring Road.

== Transport ==
Communication with other parts of the city is carried out by bus and trolleybus routes. Regular buses depart from the Chizhovka control station to Mikhanovichi. Avtozavodskaya station serves as a subway station for the residents of Chizhovka. One of the plans for the development of the Minsk metro was to make Chizhovka the southern end of the fourth line.

Buses:

3s - d / s Chizhovka - Station

5d - Mikhanavichy cemetery - Chizhovka village

5e - d / s Chyzhovka - cemetery Mikhanavichy

16 - d / z Angraskaya 4 - d / z Chizhovka

21 - d / s Shabany - d / s Chizhovka

22 - d / s Angarskaya-4 - d / s Chizhovka

48 - d / s Chizhovka - Landera

59 - d / s Chizhovka - Kulman

67 - d / s Chizhovka - Kolyadichi

88s - d / s Angarskaya-4 - Landera

94c - OS Avtozavodskaya - Chizhovsky cemetery

108 - ace Avtozavodskaya - Done

108d - d / s Chizhovka - Done

114s - d / s "Chizhovka" - Car market

117c - DS Chizhovka - st. m. Avtozavodskaya

117sd - DS Chizhovka - st. m. Avtozavodskaya

134s - d / s Chizhovka - Malinovka-4

Trolleybuses:

16 - Chizhovka-1 - Station

17 - Chizhovka-6 - DS "Drazhnya"

26 - Chizhovka-1 - st.m. Avtozavodskaya

49 - Chizhovka-1 - st.m. Tractor plant

92 - Chizhovka-6 - DS "Karastayanova"

== Healthcare ==
- 10th City Clinical Hospital
- 22 city polyclinic
- 22 children's polyclinic

== Education ==
- music school No. 43
- School No. 46
- primary school No. 112
- School No. 117
- School No. 131
- School No. 135
- School No. 143
- Educational institution "Belarusian State Aviation Academy" (77 Ubarevicha Street, Minsk, 220096, Republic of Belarus).

== See also ==
- Chyzhouka-Arena
- Administrative divisions of Minsk
