= Partyzanskaya (Minsk Metro) =

Minsk Metro station

Partyzanskaya Партызанская
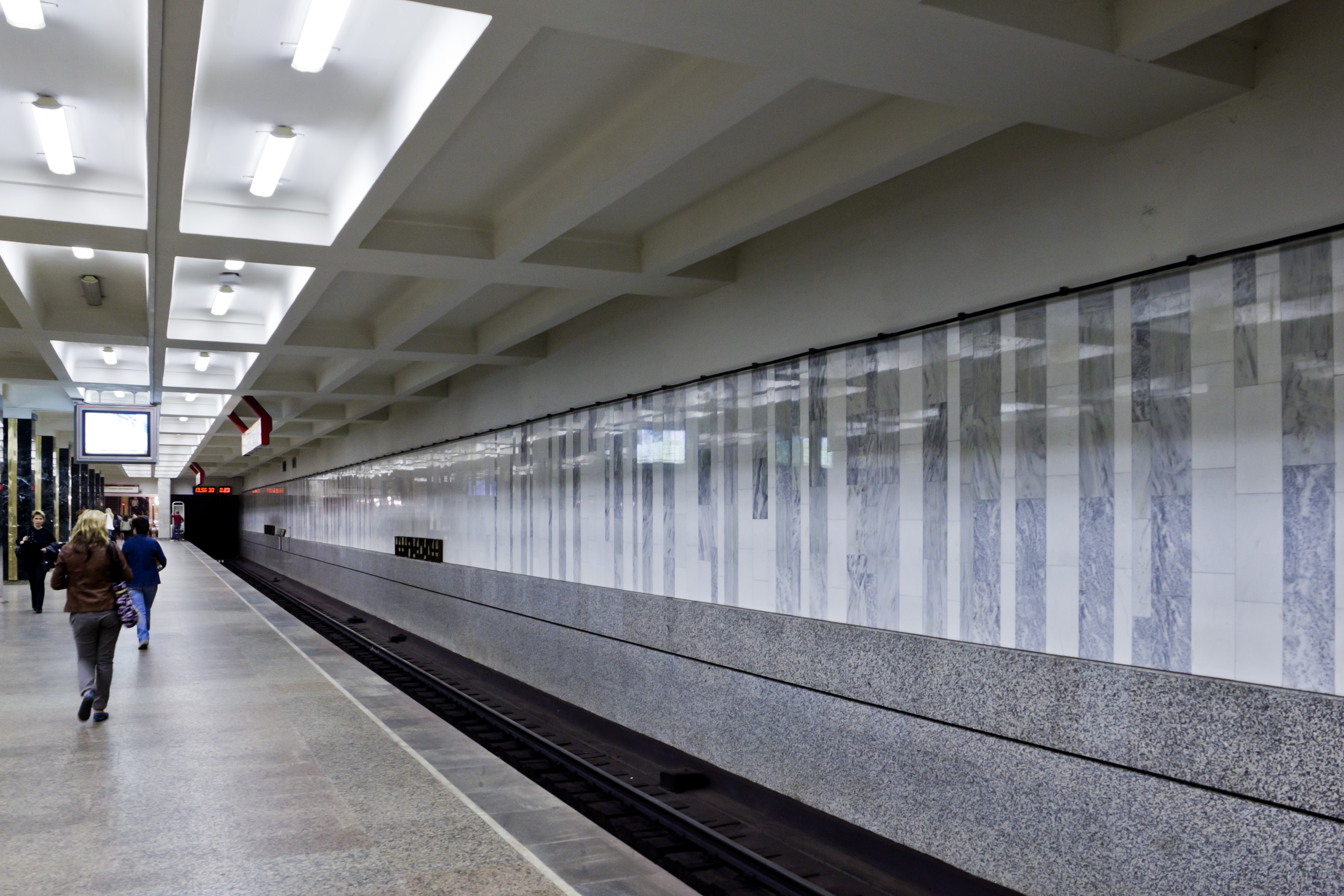
- Platform

General information
- Coordinates: 53°52′28.55″N 27°37′48.52″E
- System: Minsk Metro
- Owner: Minsk Metro
- Line: Awtazavodskaya line
- Platforms: 1 island platform
- Tracks: 2

Construction
- Structure type: Underground

Other information
- Station code: 212

History
- Opened: 7 November 1997; 28 years ago

Services
Preceding station	Minsk Metro	Following station
Traktarny zavod towards Kamyennaya Horka	Awtazavodskaya line	Awtazavodskaya towards Mahilyowskaya
Location
- Location within Belarus

Partyzanskaya (Belarusian: Партызанская; Russian: Партизанская; lit.: "Partisans' station") is a Minsk Metro station, which opened on 7 November 1997.

== Gallery ==
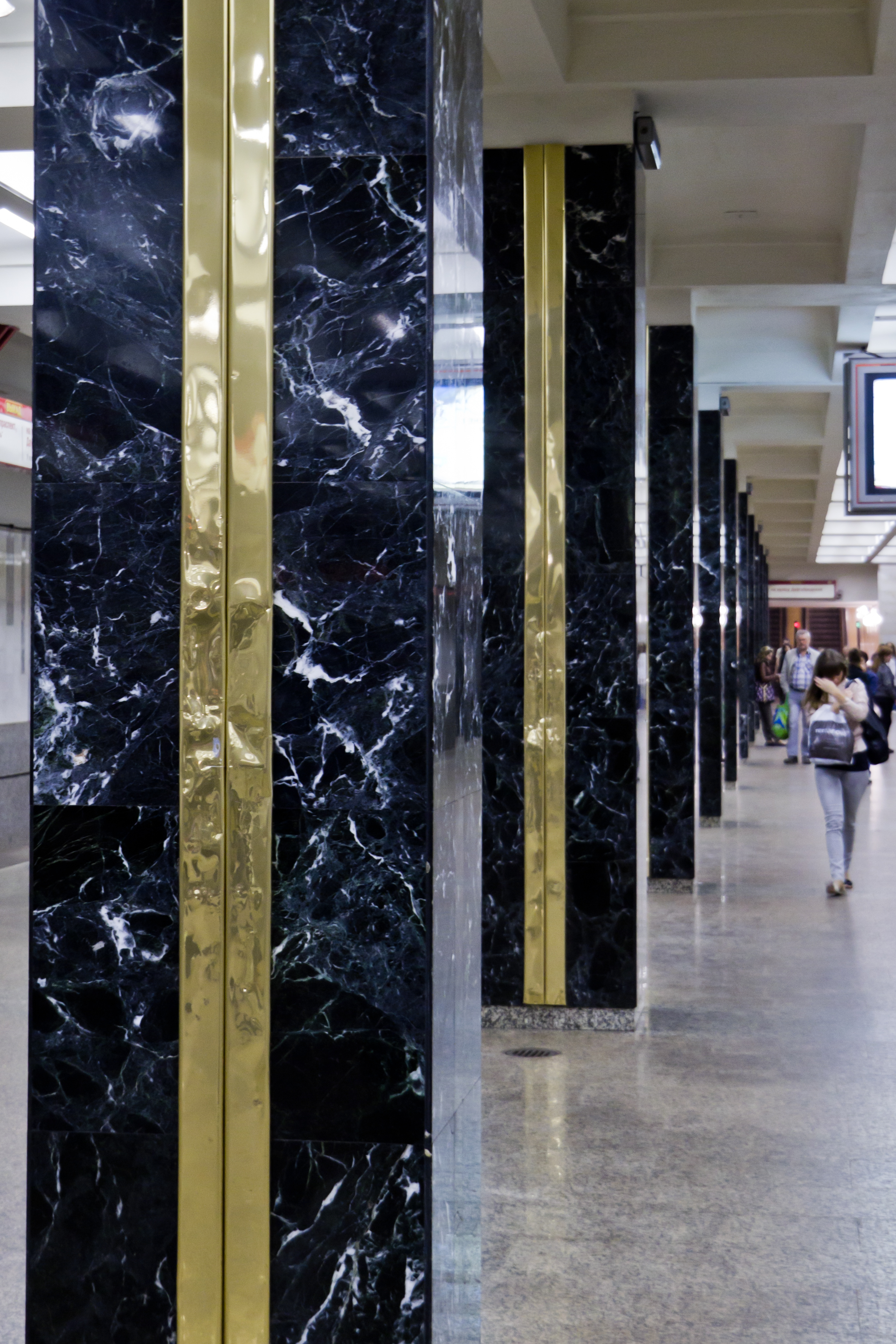
Columns in the platform hall

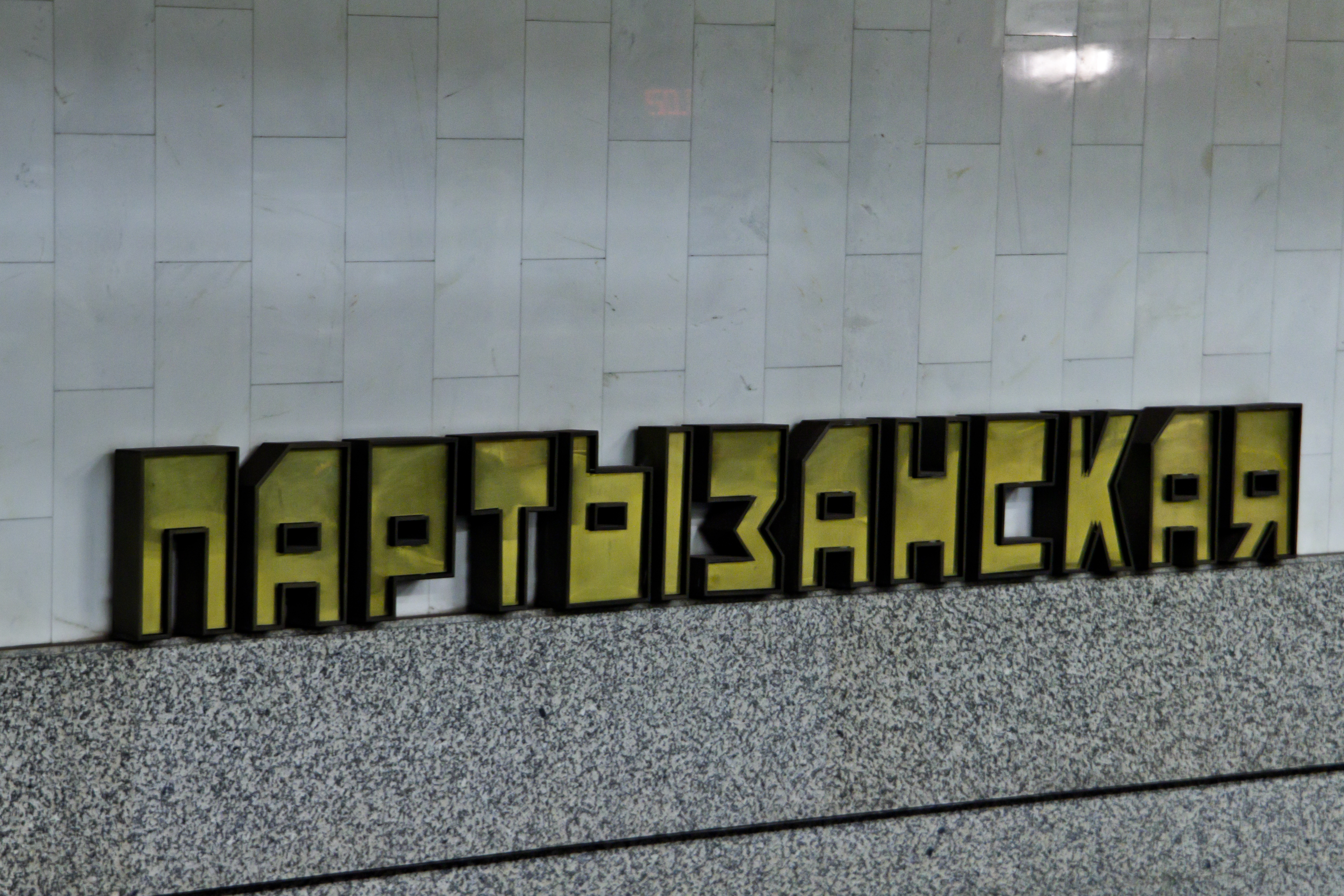
Station sign
