= Minsk Zoo =

Zoo located in Minsk

Coordinates: 53°51′2″N 27°38′5″E

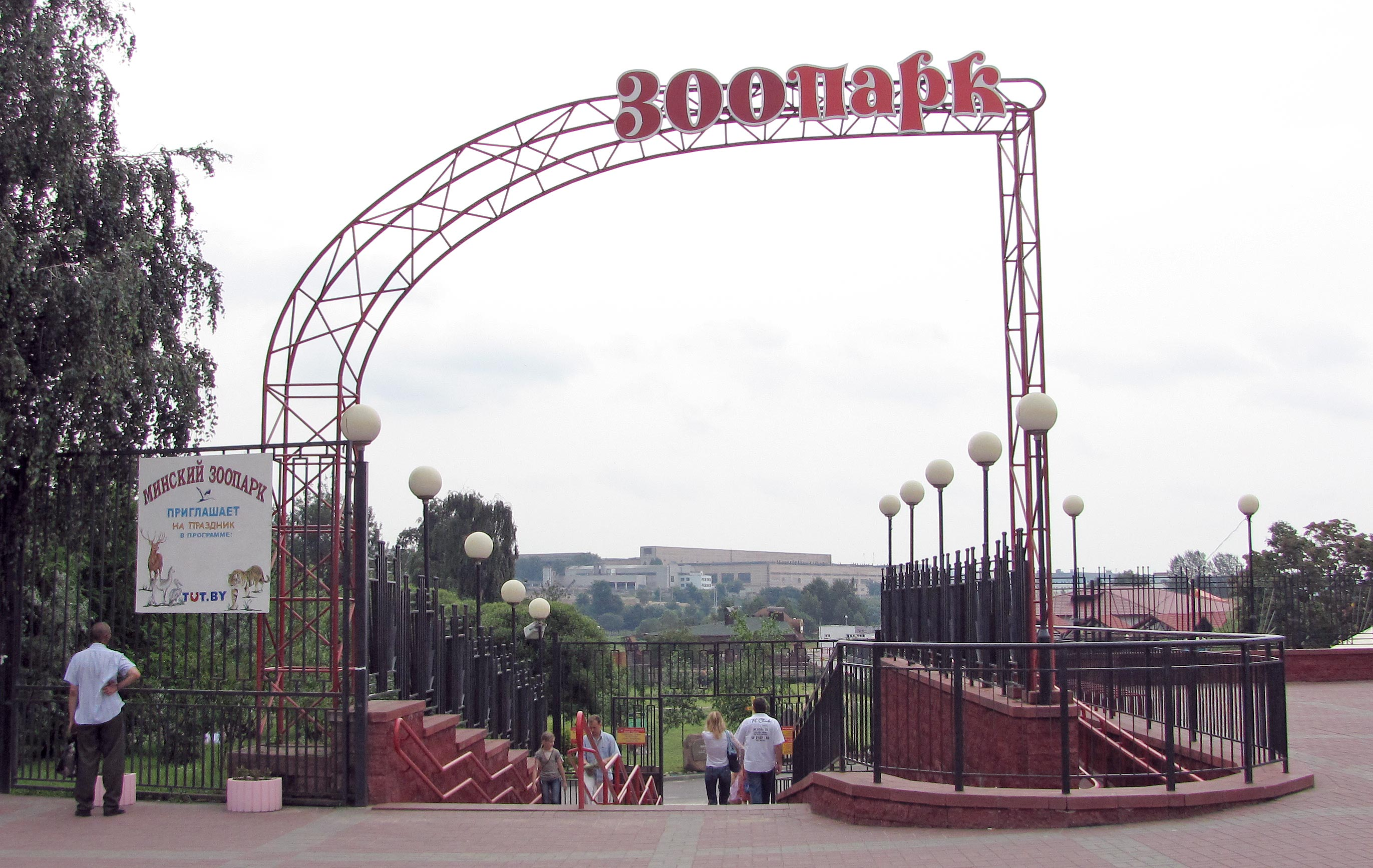
- Entrance to Minsk Zoo, 2009 Zoo
- Interactive map of Minsk Zoo
- Location: Minsk
- No. of animals: 3585
- No. of species: 186

Minsk Zoo (Russian: Минский зоопарк, romanized: Minskij zoopark) is located in a southeast part of Minsk near Svislach River.

== Location and extent ==
Minsk Zoo is situated in the southeast part of Minsk in the floodplain of the river Svisloch. According to the order of the Minsk City Council on 2 March 2001, the territory allocated for the Minsk Zoo has a total area of 42 hectares (100 acres) in frameworks of the streets Uborevicha, Tashkentskaya, Golodeda, and Mashinostroiteley. This area is bordered by a large urban district Chyzhouka to the south, the industrial zone of Minsk Automobile Plant to the north, and the Chizhovskoye water reservoir with a recreation zone to the west.

== History ==
The Minsk Zoo was established in 1984 by nature amateurs from the Minsk Automobile Plant. Its founder and the first manager was Fedor Revsin, an engineer and a designer of the Minsk Automobile Plant, and the chairman of the Nature Amateurs Club of the plant. The first acquisitions of the new zoo were wild animals, which had found themselves in miserable conditions (an injured white stork, swans, polluted with black oil in an industrial precipitation pond, young roes, small foxes, and others).

The zoo first opened to visitors, who were mostly Minsk inhabitants, on 9 August 1984. In 1994, the zoological garden acquired at last the status of the Minsk Municipal Zoo, as well as a municipal subsidy for feeding animals. However, its development and capital construction were kept by municipal authorities due to various ecological factors: the zoo was quite near to the industrial area of the plant, Chizhovka lake, and the floodplain of the Svislach river.

== Further development ==
In 2000 there was the decision of Minsk City Council made for further development of the Zoo along the floodplain of the Svislach:

Exposition area of "South America" with a tropical pavilion and open enclosures, children’s zoo, also service and household buildings (booking office, entry control station, garages, store-houses). For the years 2003-2005 the municipal authorities have granted financial support for realization of these projects.

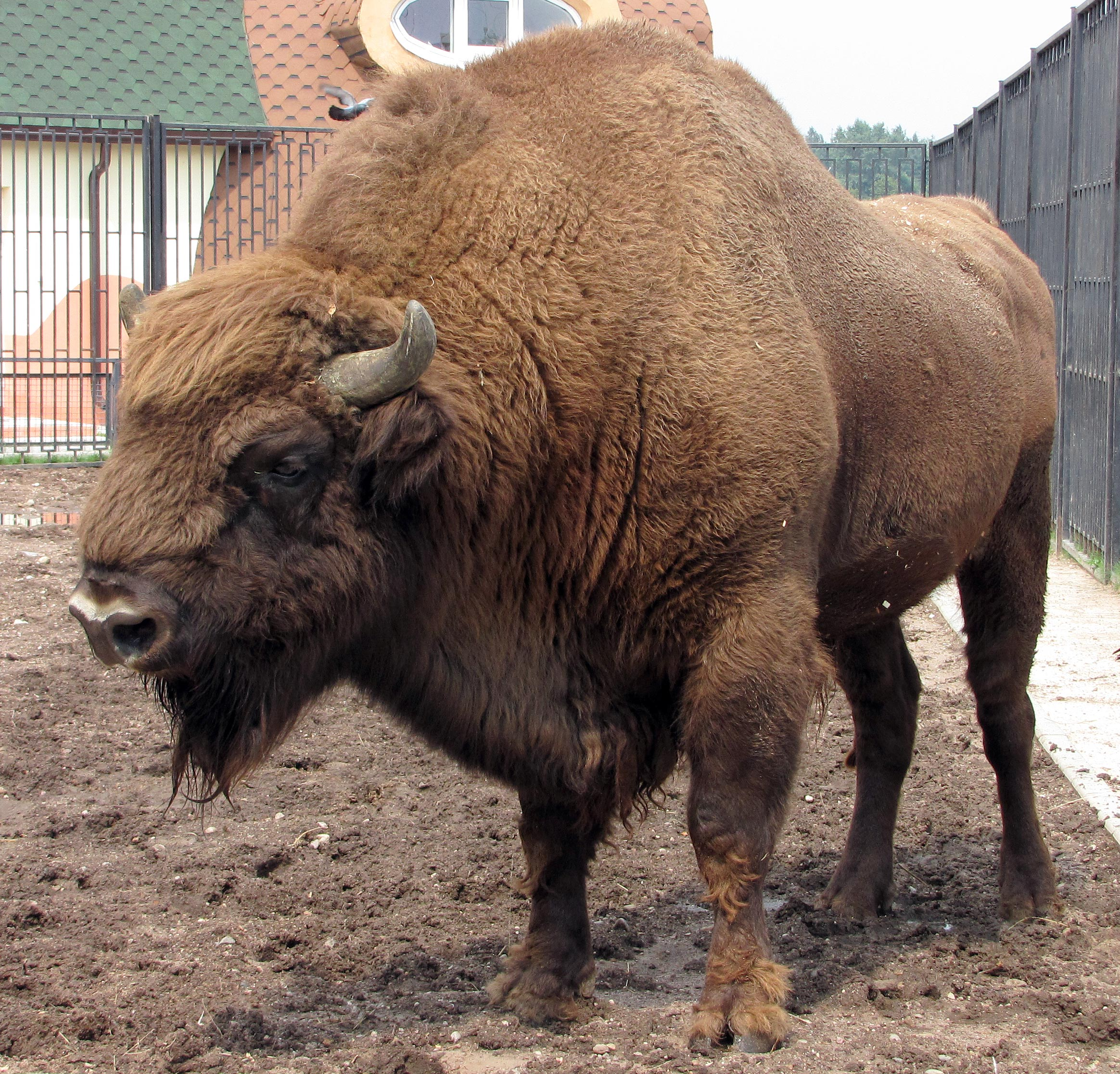
A male wisent at Minsk Zoo.

== Animals ==
At present, the collection of animals of Minsk Zoo totals 3585 animals in 186 species:

- 1343 mammals in 64 species
- 213 birds in 47 species
- 92 reptiles in 53 species
- 19 amphibians in 6 species
- 1927 invertebrates in 16 species

== International cooperation ==
Minsk Zoo is a full member of the Eurasian Regional Association of Zoos and Aquariums (EARAZA) since 1997.
