= Awtazavodskaya (Minsk Metro) =

Minsk Metro station

Awtazavodskaya Аўтазаводская
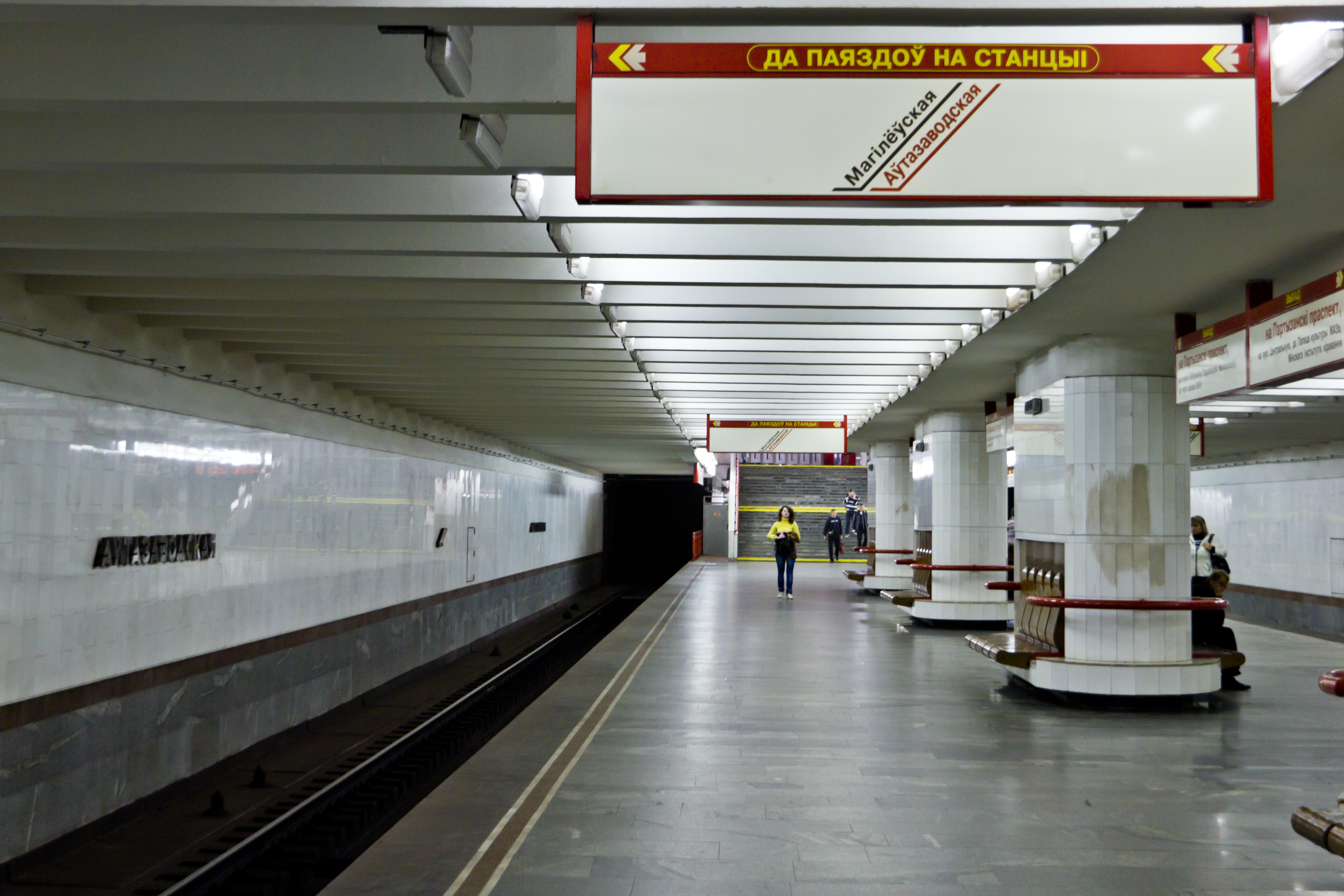

General information
- Coordinates: 53°52′8.56″N 27°38′55.13″E
- System: Minsk Metro
- Owner: Minsk Metro
- Line: Awtazavodskaya line
- Platforms: 1 island platform
- Tracks: 2

Construction
- Structure type: Underground

Other information
- Station code: 211

History
- Opened: 7 November 1997; 28 years ago

Services
Preceding station	Minsk Metro	Following station
Partyzanskaya towards Kamyennaya Horka	Awtazavodskaya line	Mahilyowskaya Terminus
Location
- Location within Belarus

Awtazavodskaya (Belarusian: Аўтазаводская; Russian: Автозаводская, romanized: Avtazavodskaja) is a Minsk Metro station. It was opened on 7 November 1997.

== Gallery ==
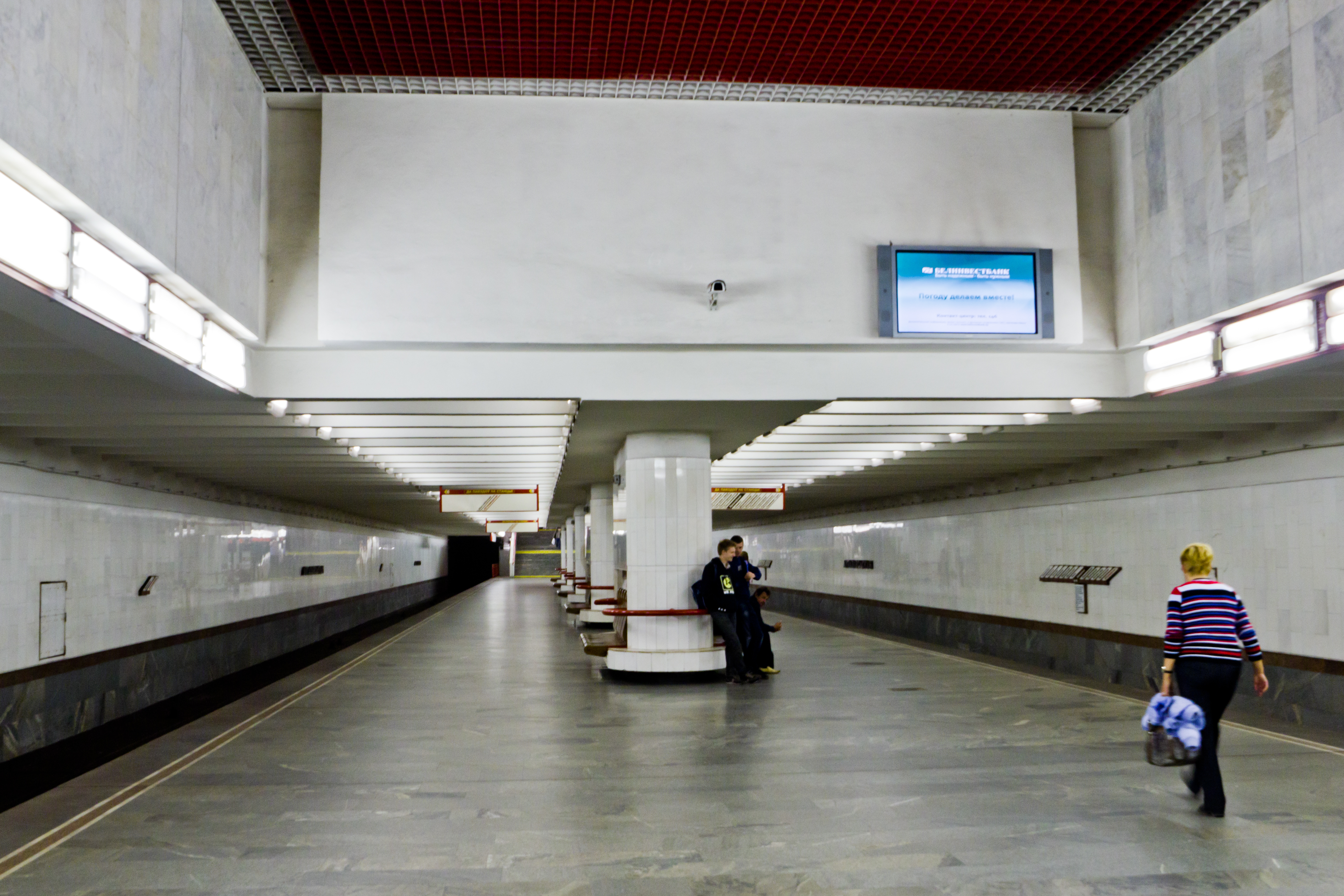

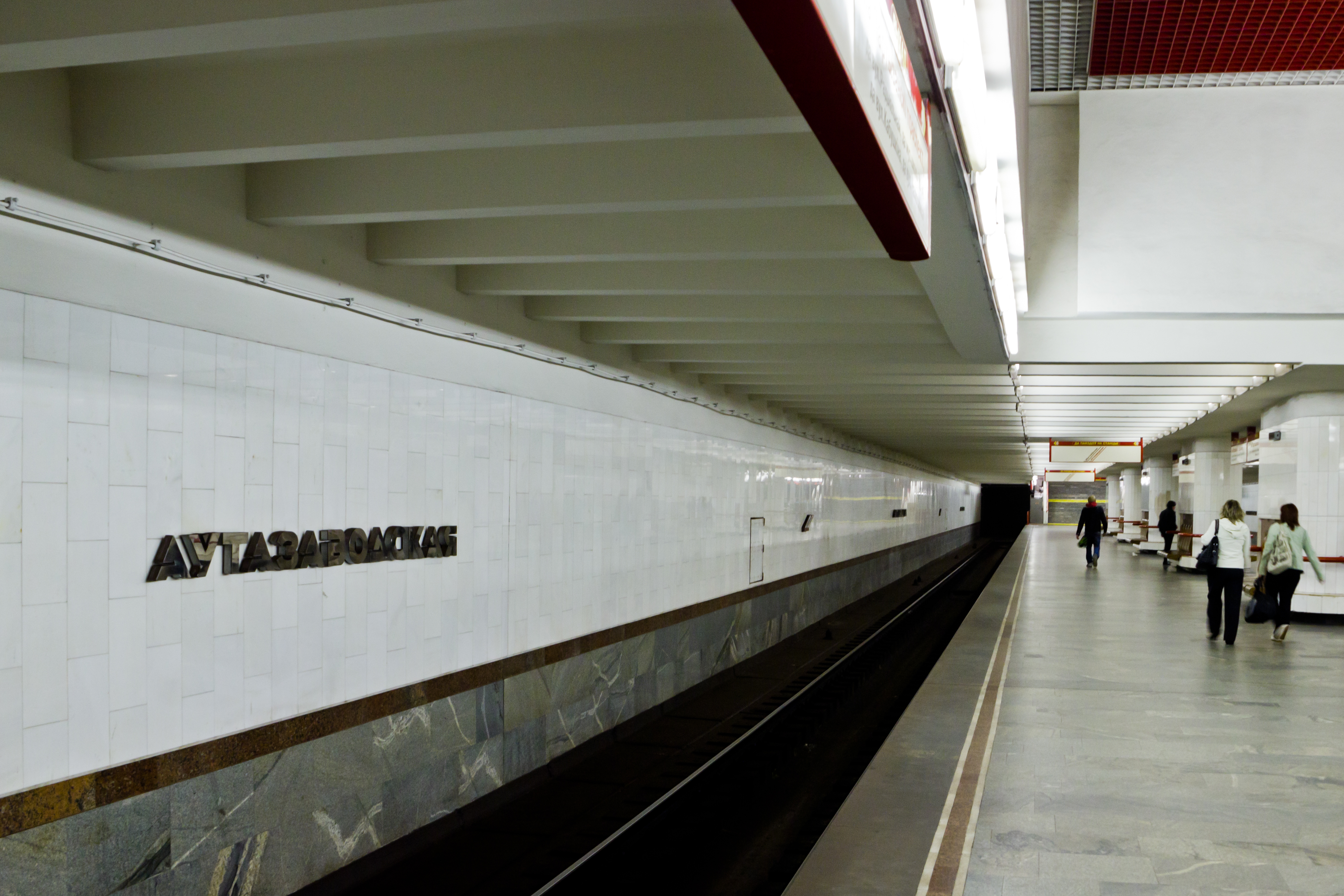

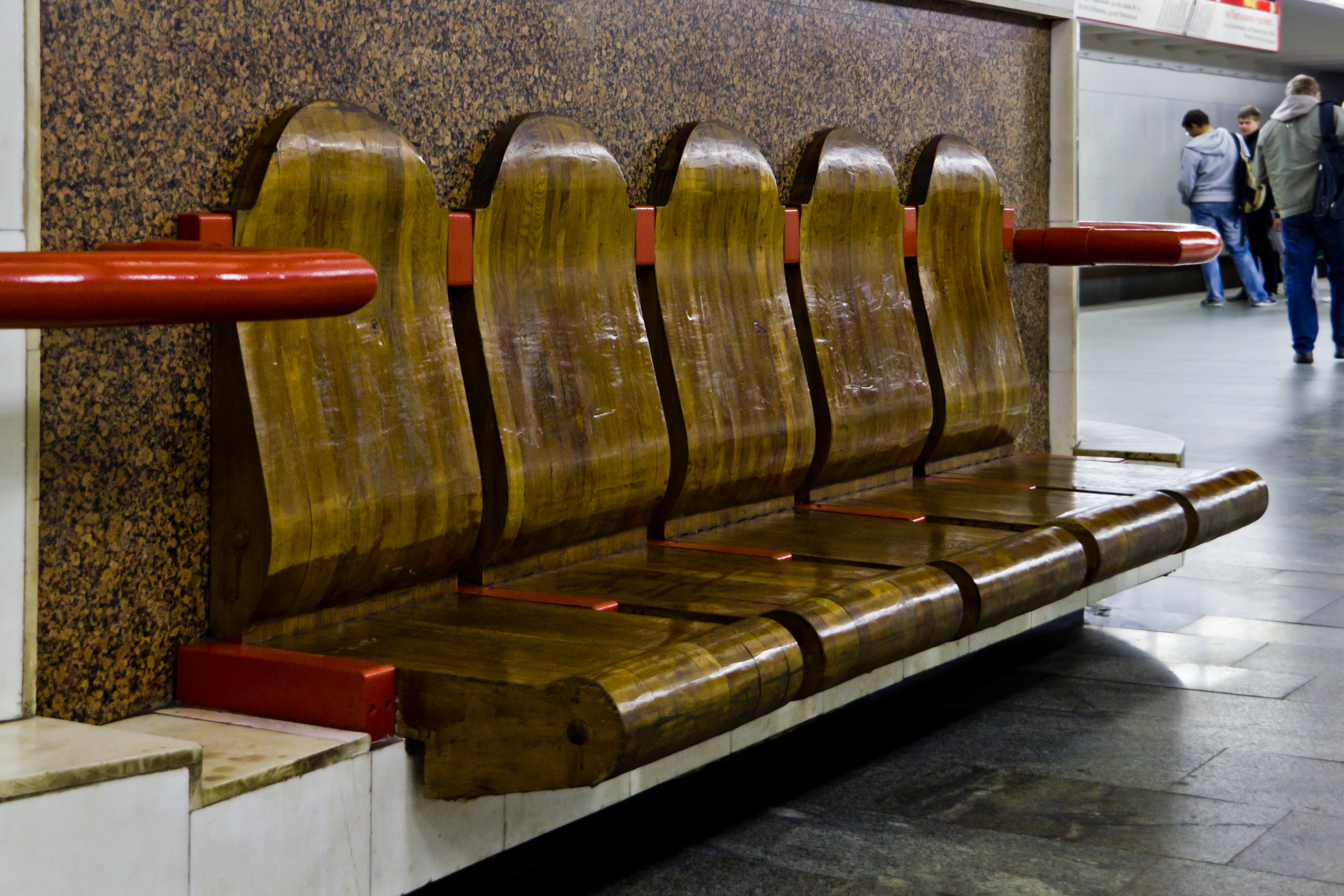

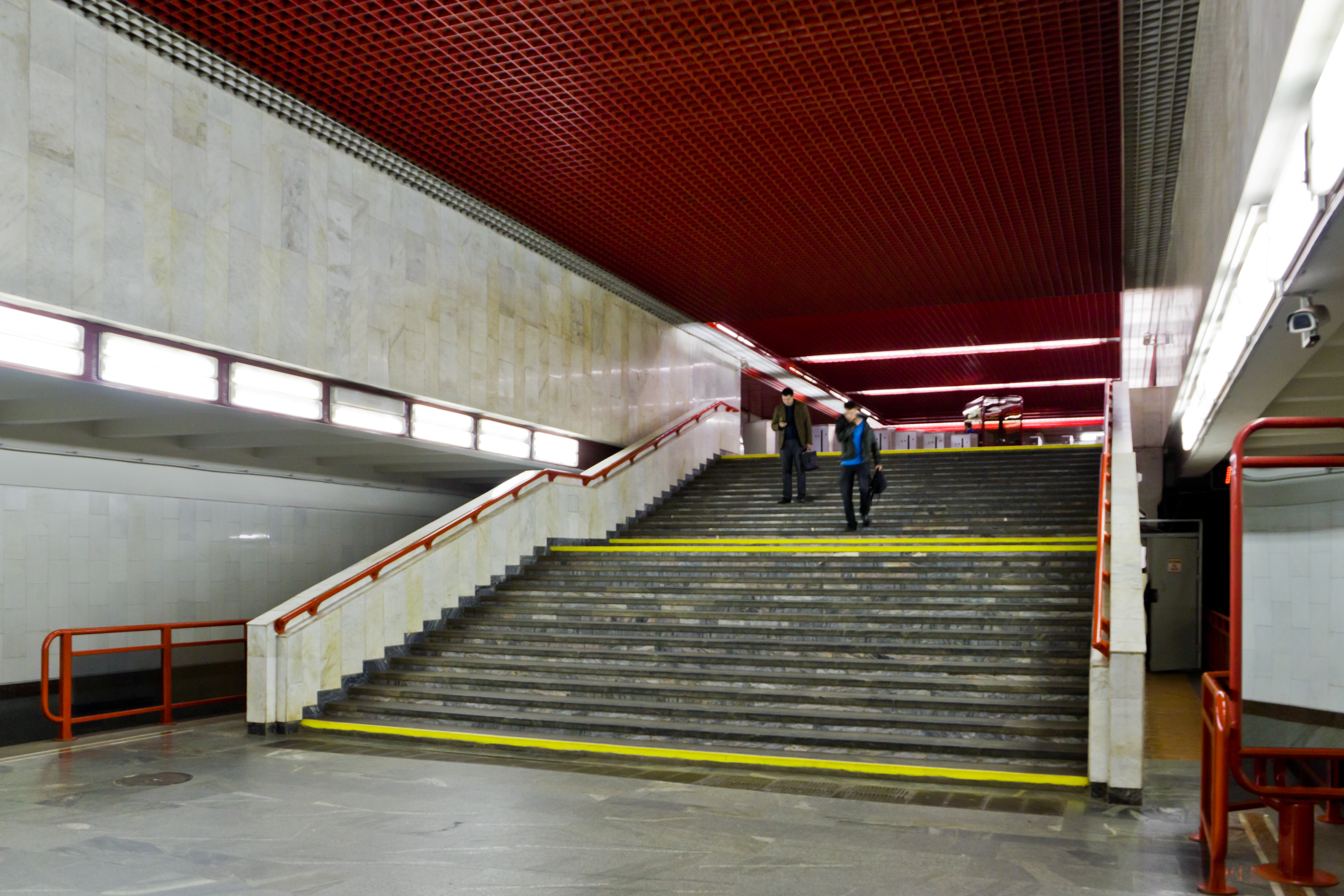
