= Mahilyowskaya (Minsk Metro) =

Minsk Metro station

Mahilyowskaya Магілёўская
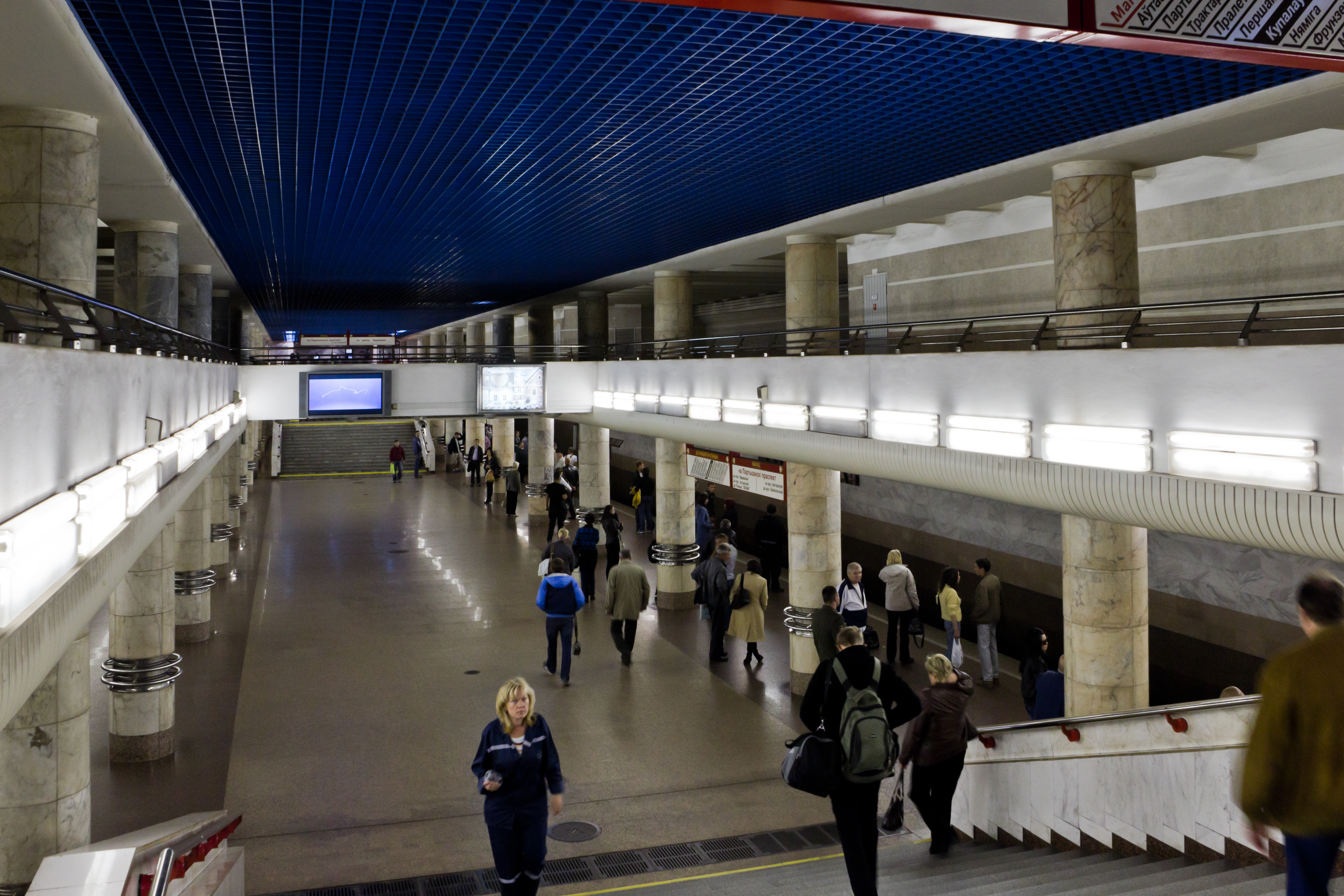
- Station Hall

General information
- Coordinates: 53°51′43.18″N 27°40′27.49″E
- System: Minsk Metro
- Owner: Minsk Metro
- Line: Awtazavodskaya line
- Platforms: 1 island platform
- Tracks: 2

Construction
- Structure type: Underground

Other information
- Station code: 210

History
- Opened: 5 September 2001; 24 years ago

Services
Preceding station	Minsk Metro	Following station
Awtazavodskaya towards Kamyennaya Horka	Awtazavodskaya line	Terminus
Location
- Location within Belarus

Mahilyowskaya (Belarusian: Магілёўская; Russian: Могилёвская) is a Minsk Metro station. It was opened on 5 September 2001.

== Gallery ==
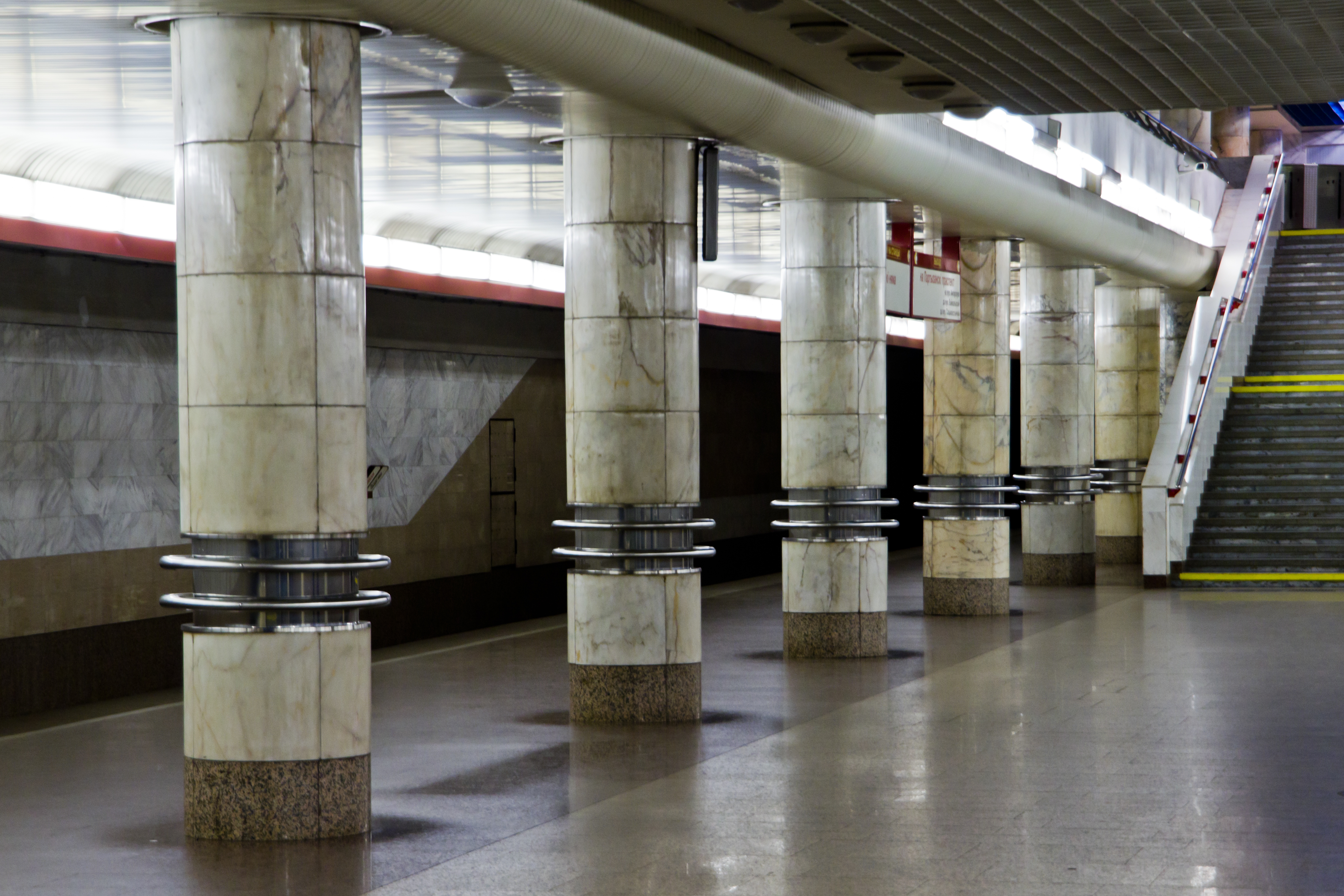
Columns in the platform hall

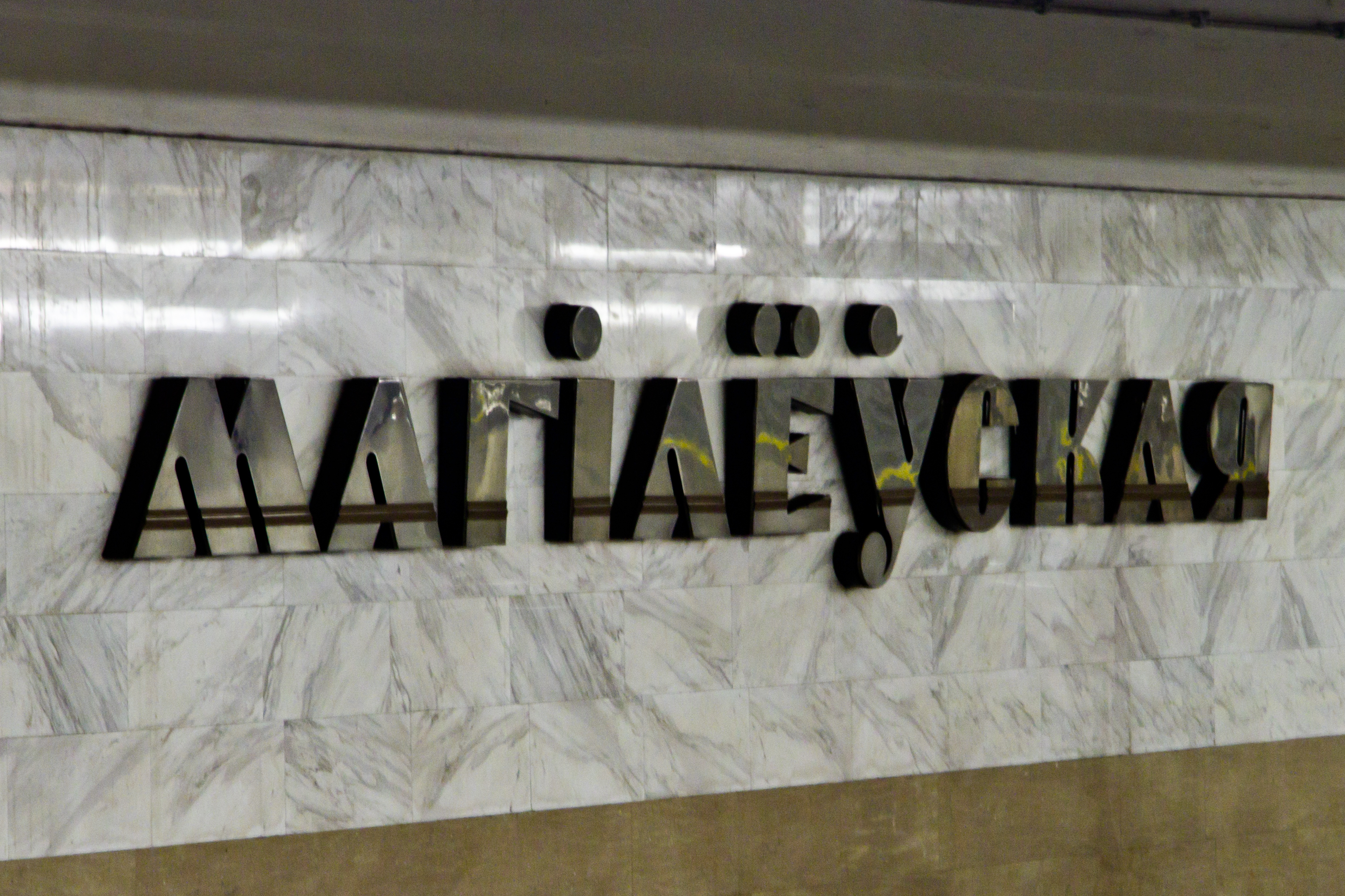
Name of the station on the platform wall

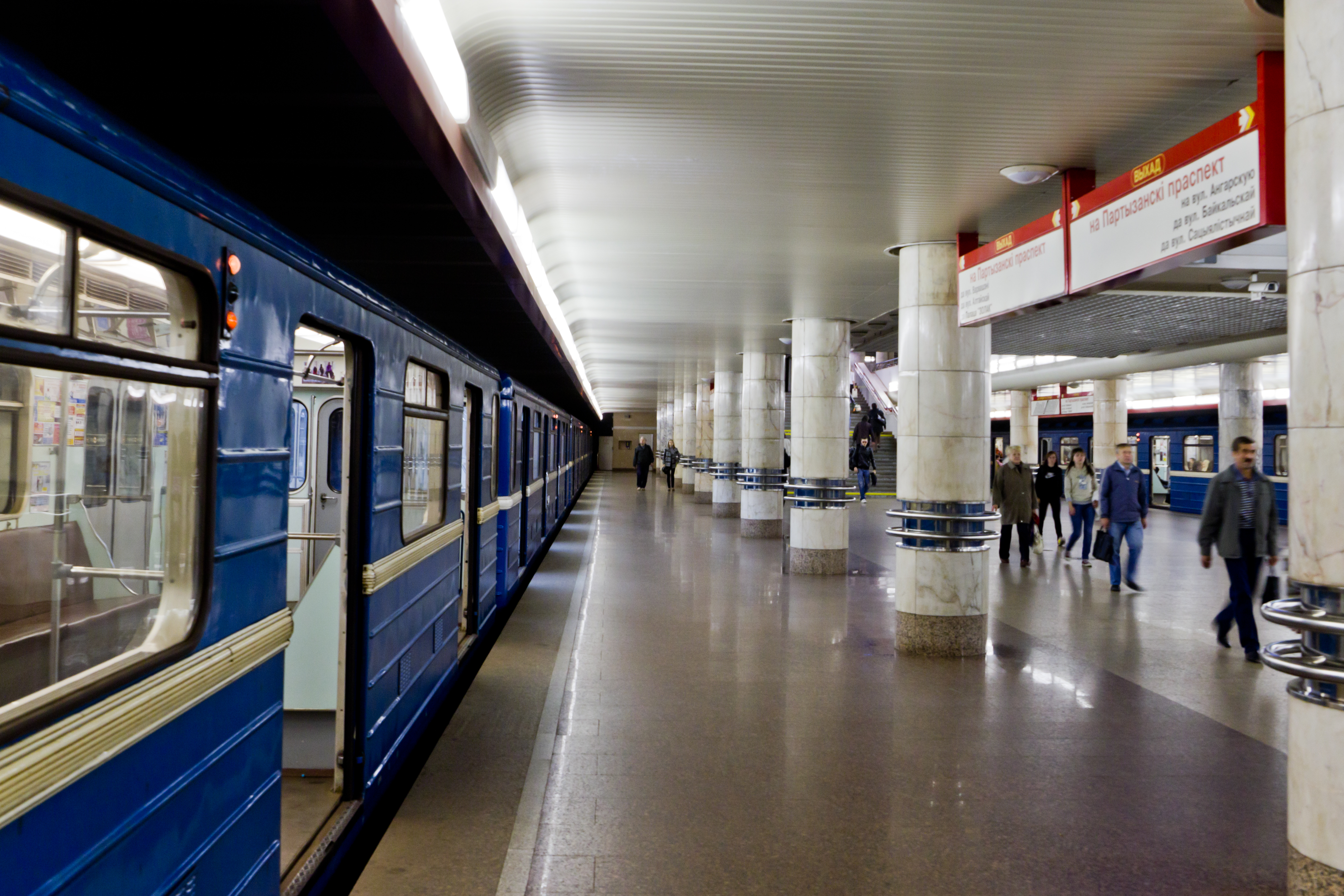
Platform

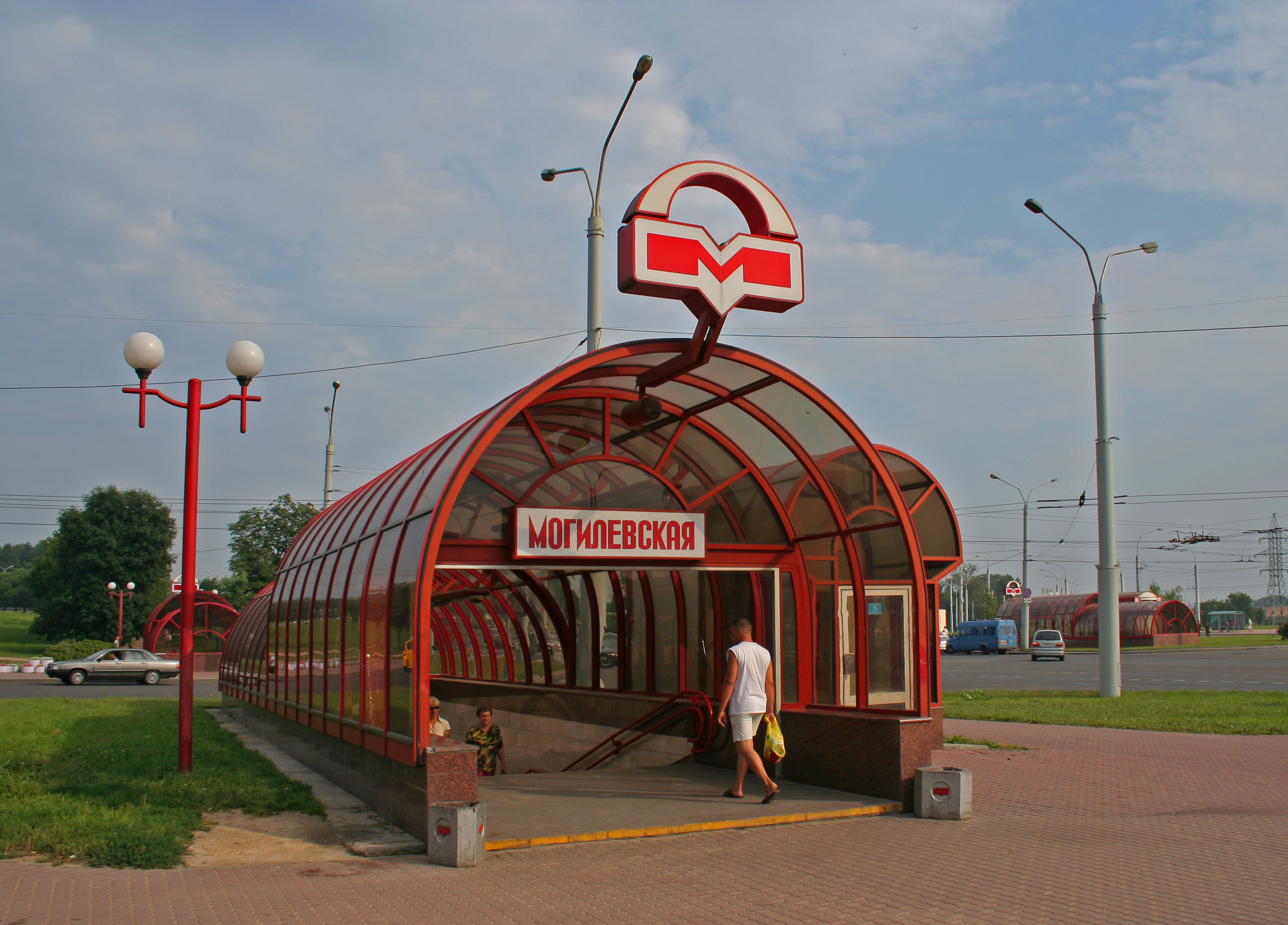

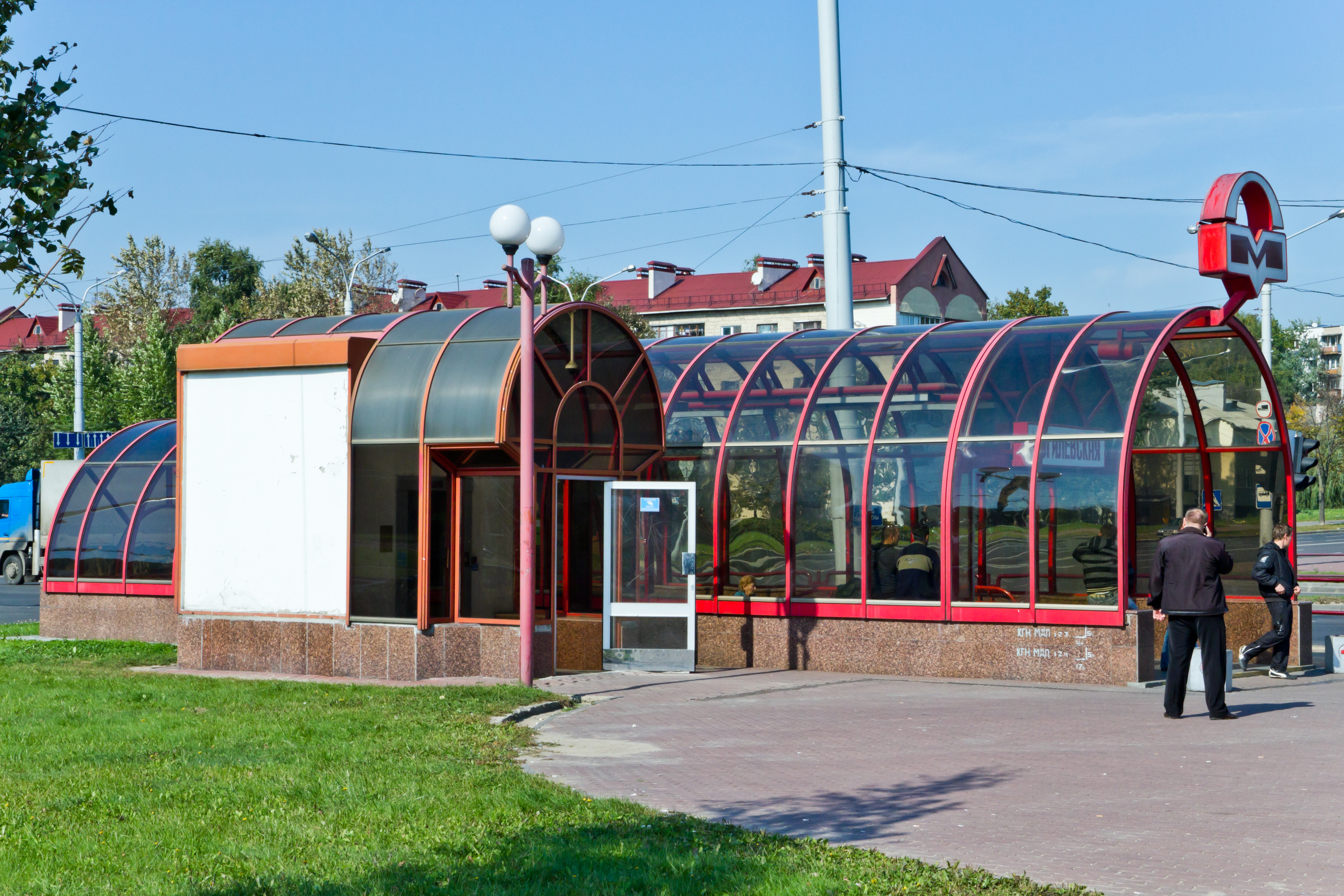

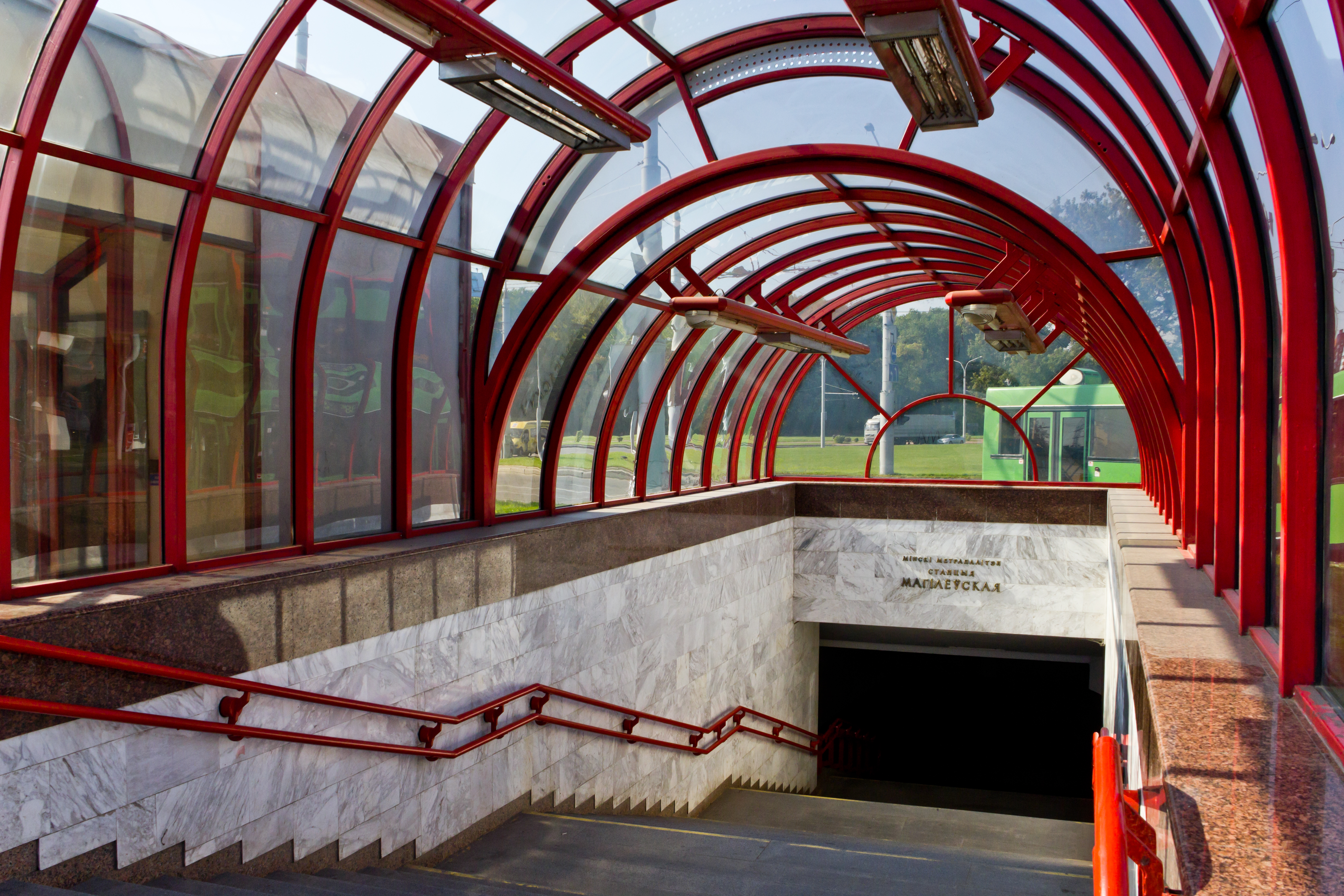
