= Maksym Kozytskyi =

Ukrainian politician (born 1981)

- Максим Козицький
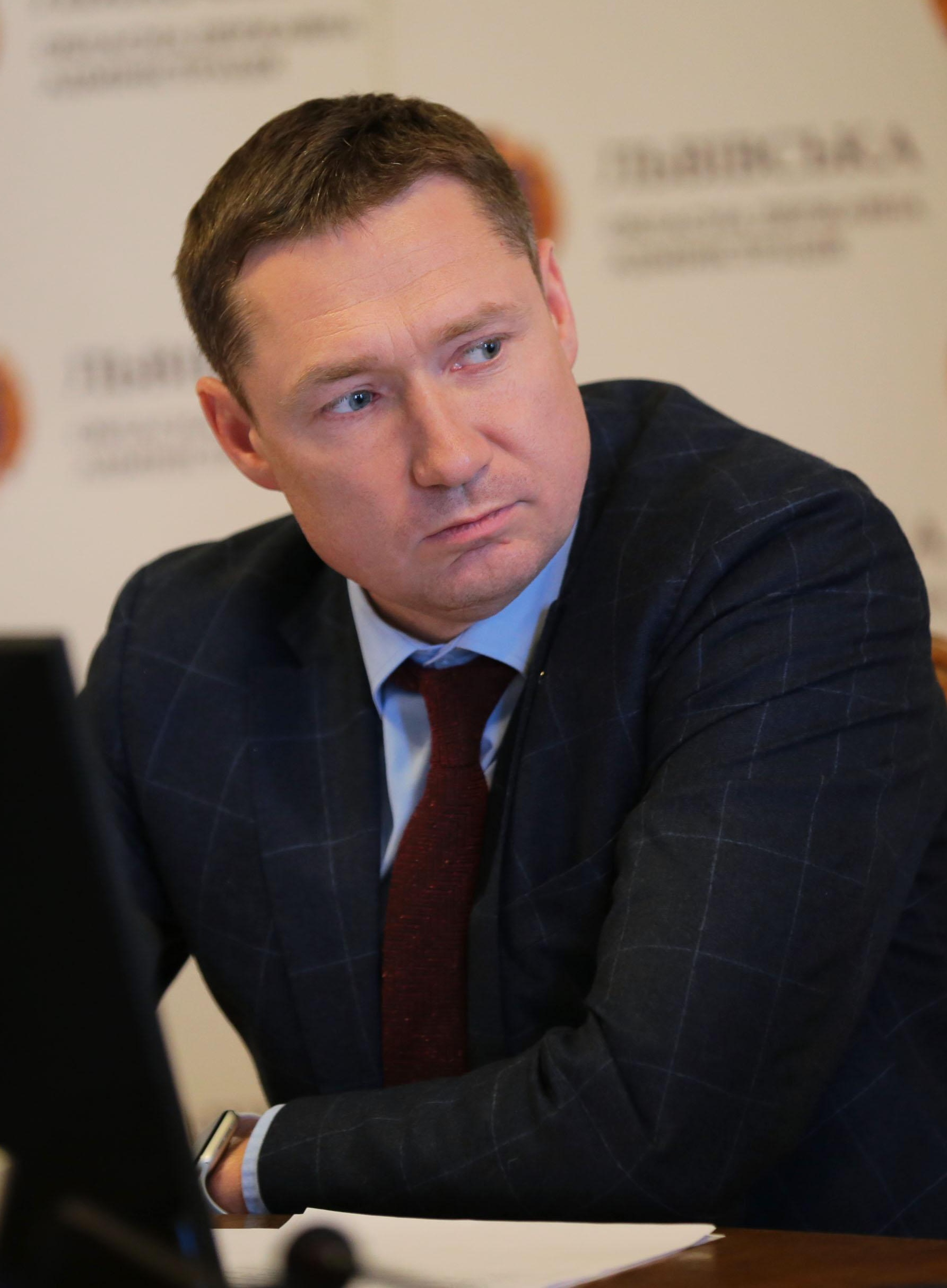
- Kozytskyi in 2020

Governor of Lviv Oblast
- Incumbent
- Assumed office 5 February 2020
- Preceded by: Markiyan Malsky

Personal details
- Born: 19 February 1981 (age 45) Lviv, Ukrainian SSR, Soviet Union
- Party: Servant of the People
- Education: Danylo Halytsky Lviv National Medical University; National University of Kyiv-Mohyla Academy; Ivan Franko National University of Lviv
- Occupation: Politician; entrepreneur

Maksym Zinoviyovych Kozytskyi (Ukrainian: Максим Зіновійович Козицький, born 19 February 1981) is a Ukrainian entrepreneur, politician, and Governor of Lviv Regional State Administration as of 5 February 2020.

== Early life ==
Between 1998 and 2004, he studied to become a surgeon at Danylo Halytsky Lviv National Medical University. In 2005—2007, he studied at the National University of Kyiv-Mohyla Academy, where he received a master's degree in organisational management, and at the Institute of Postgraduate Education of the Ivan Franko National University of Lviv, where he received a specialist degree in accounting and auditing.

In September 2007 Kozytskyi occupied different positions in energy companies such as Ukrnaftogazinvest LLC and Precarpathian Energy Company LLC. In October 2016 he took the position of CEO of Eco-Optima LLC.

== Politics ==
In 2015, Kozytskyi stood for election to the Lviv Regional Council for the political party «Self Reliance», but he was not accepted to the council. In the summer of 2019, he was a candidate for the position of the Governor of Lviv regional state administration (LRSA) together with Markiyan Malsky and Denys Shmyhal but did not get the position. However, in December 2019 Malsky announced his dismissal and Maksym Kozytskyi was approved by the Government of Ukraine for the position of the Governor of LRSA.

On February 5, 2020 the President of Ukraine Volodymyr Zelenskyy signed an order approve Maksym Kozytskyi as the Governor of Lviv Regional State Administration. At the same time, Kozytskyi became the chief of Lviv Regional Organization of the political party Servant of the People.

In October 2020 Kozytskyi was the first in the party list of Servant of the People at the elections to the Lviv Regional Council and the party obtained 9 seats, thus, becoming the second major party in the Lviv Regional Council.

== Governor of Lviv Oblast ==
=== 2020 ===
Almost immediately after his appointment as the head of the Lviv Regional State Administration, Maksym Kozytskyi coordinated the work to counter the COVID-19 pandemic in the region. In March 2020, at the initiative of the Lviv Regional State Administration, doctors involved in the care of patients with suspected coronavirus were paid additional funds.

In the same month, Maksym Kozytskyi called on entrepreneurs, MPs and philanthropists to join the fundraising to purchase equipment for medical institutions to counter the coronavirus epidemic. The following month, Maksym Kozytskyi donated his salary to charity: the funds raised at the Lviv Regional State Administration were used to purchase protective suits for doctors.

Despite the spread of COVID-19 and quarantine restrictions, large-scale road repairs continued in Lviv region in 2020. A record UAH 4.5 billion was raised from all sources of funding, which was used to repair 528 km of roads.

Under the Big Construction programme, 13 social facilities were built or reconstructed, including 5 kindergartens, 5 schools and 3 sports facilities. UAH 197.1 million was spent on the completed projects. Of this amount, UAH 151.2 million was financed from the State Regional Development Fund. The rest - UAH 45.9 million - came from the budgets of local governments.

In particular, a long reconstruction of the SKIF stadium of the Lviv State University of Physical Culture, which was unfinished as part of the state programme for Euro 2012, was completed. In December, the reconstruction was followed by the opening of the outpatient and radiology departments of the Lviv Regional Cancer Treatment and Diagnostic Centre.

=== 2021 ===
In 2021, the Lviv Regional State Administration completed a number of projects to reconstruct medical facilities. In particular, in April, the Lviv Okhmatdyt opened high-comfort wards with cosy renovations, kitchenettes with bathrooms, and all the conditions for a child to stay with his or her parents.

In May, the new admission department of the Chervonohrad hospital began operating. A new administrative building and car ramps were built here, the roof was replaced, and medical equipment was purchased as part of the Big Construction programme.

In July, a new branch of the Halychyna Centre for Comprehensive Rehabilitation for Persons with Disabilities was opened in Velykyi Liubin. The complex was built over 12 years, attracting UAH 95 million from the state budget. It can accommodate 150 patients at a time. The centre implements the experience of Austrian rehabilitation institutions in practice.

On 1 October 2021, aeromedical evacuation was resumed in the Lviv region. A National Police of Ukraine helicopter has arrived at Cherliany airport to transport patients to hospitals. About UAH 15 million was allocated from the state budget for this project.

The reconstruction of the Lviv Regional Clinical Perinatal Centre, which had been underway since 2013, was completed. In July, the centre's gynaecological department was opened, and in November, the post-intensive care unit for newborns and preterm infants was launched. The reconstruction was funded by the state and regional budgets. In April 2024, the Lviv Regional Perinatal Centre opened a maternity ward, operating theatre, and intensive care units in the shelter of the Lviv Regional Perinatal Centre: everything necessary for women to give birth safely. The area of the underground maternity ward is 700 m2. More than UAH 16.4 million was spent on its arrangement. The Lviv Regional Clinical Perinatal Centre is currently the first in Ukraine in terms of the number of medical care provided during childbirth.

In addition, between April 2020 and November 2021, 34 outpatient clinics were completed in Lviv region — 32 of which were newly built, one reconstructed and one repaired.

In addition to investing in medical facilities, in 2021, the regional authorities continued to develop security and transport infrastructure. In March, at the initiative of the Lviv Regional State Administration, the Safe Lviv Region programme was launched in the region, a tool that allowed hundreds of millions of hryvnias to be quickly transferred to the needs of the defenders after the full-scale invasion at the request of military units. In 2021, the modernisation of the Lviv Military Lyceum named after the Heroes of Kruty was completed: the institution renovated its gymnasiums, obstacle course and created a unique field for team-tactical games. The territory was renovated: instead of overgrown ruins, modern sports grounds, new asphalt and landscaping appeared. More than ten modern classrooms with multimedia sets and new furniture in accordance with the standards of the New Ukrainian School were equipped in the school building.

In September of the same year, one of the longest bridges in western Ukraine, which had been in disrepair since 2008, was reopened for traffic after repairs. The bridge in Stryi Raion, which connected the Kyiv-Chop highway with the village of Skhidnytsia, was destroyed by a flood. Since then, it has been in a state of disrepair, and people have been using a temporary bridge. Local residents waited 14 years for its restoration.

=== 2022 ===
With the start of full-scale Russian invasion of Ukraine, the Lviv region became a place of refuge for hundreds of thousands of Ukrainians who had to flee their homes. The Lviv Regional Military Administration, established on the basis of the Lviv Regional State Administration, in cooperation with volunteers and local communities, coordinated the settlement and distribution of humanitarian aid to internally displaced persons. A day after the invasion began, a centre for internally displaced persons was set up in Lviv at the Arena Lviv. Seven humanitarian aid distribution centres in Lviv also started operating.

Internally displaced persons were provided with places to stay in dormitories, schools, medical and administrative institutions, and religious communities. Later, IDP assistance centres were established in each district of the region.

In February, additional pedestrian crossings on the Ukrainian-Polish border were opened in Lviv region — at the Krakivets, Smilnytsia, Hrushev, Nyzhankovychi—Malhowice and Varyazh—Usmezh checkpoints — to facilitate the faster evacuation of refugees and foreigners.

Since the first days of the invasion, Lviv region has become a leader in business relocation: as of 31 May 2022, 147 companies from other regions have moved to Lviv region, 90 of which have already started operating and created more than 4,000 jobs.

A working group formed on the initiative of Maksym Kozytskyi to search for objects owned by the Russian Federation and its residents has identified more than 200 such enterprises in the Lviv region. The processed list of enterprises was sent to the National Security and Defence Council of Ukraine for response.

A paediatric oncology and bone marrow transplant clinic was opened at the Western Ukrainian Specialised Children's Medical Centre. The bone marrow transplant clinic is part of a government pilot project that provides free surgery and treatment for patients. Such operations cost from UAH 2 to 2.5 million. As the head of the Lviv Regional State Administration Maksym Kozytskyi noted at the opening, the budget provided by the sponsors is 450 thousand euros. UAH 8 million was allocated from the regional budget and UAH 14.6 million from the state budget.

=== 2023 ===
On 10 March 2023, ten cars were handed over, completing Maksym Kozytskyi's 1000 Freedom Cars initiative. In 10 months, the joint efforts of volunteers, organisations and businesses from around the world managed to deliver 1000 vehicles to the frontline for military personnel, rescuers and medics.

In April 2023, the first stage of the National Centre for Prosthetics and Rehabilitation Superhumans Centre was opened in the town of Vynnyky near Lviv. The Superhumans Centre was founded on the initiative of Ukrainian entrepreneur Andrey Stavnitser, with the support of the ULA and the Ministry of Health of Ukraine. The supervisory board of Superhumans includes the First Lady of Ukraine, Olena Zelenska. This is a comprehensive medical facility where patients are treated and rehabilitated. First of all, those who were injured as a result of Russian aggression. In June 2024, the full Superhumans complex began operating. More than 60 medical specialists work here. The centre can receive about 3,000 patients annually. More than $50 million in mostly foreign investment was raised for the construction and operation of Superhumans. By 2023, 43 newly built family medicine outpatient clinics had been opened in the Lviv region as part of the Affordable Care Act. The forty-third healthcare facility is an outpatient clinic in the village of Bilychi of the Starosambirska AH. It provides services to the residents of three villages with a total population of over 2000 people.

In 2023, the Lviv region joined the "Side by Side" programme to rebuild destroyed homes in the Kherson region. Construction crews from Lviv Oblast worked in three communities in Kherson Oblast. UAH 10 million was allocated for the restoration of 300 objects.

In July, the reconstruction of the Military Lyceum of the Hetman Petro Sahaidachnyi National Army Academy in Sheptytskyi was completed. The roof, windows, and utility networks were replaced, interior finishing works were carried out, the facade was insulated, warning and fire extinguishing systems were installed, and the Internet was installed. The lyceum was licensed to educate 400 people. It provides complete general secondary education and in-depth pre-professional training for further study at higher military educational institutions of Ukraine.

In July 2023, Maksym Kozytskyi issued a decree creating a capable medical network for the hospital district of Lviv region. The Lviv Hospital District included 37 hospitals, of which 9 were supercluster hospitals, 7 were cluster hospitals, and 21 were general hospitals. In 2024, rehabilitation departments with psychological health centres were opened on the basis of cluster hospitals in each district of Lviv region.

In October 2023, the Lviv region received fire teams to shoot down Russian kamikaze drones. Under the coordination of Maksym Kozytskyi, the Air Command West of the Armed Forces of Ukraine received equipment for the first 30 mobile fire groups. Each group includes a vehicle equipped with thermal imagers, night vision devices, laser pointers, flashlights, sights, tablets, and weapons to shoot down attack drones.

In the same month, Maksym Kozytskyi issued a decree restricting non-priority expenditures from the local budgets of Lviv region and cancelling 22 procurements. According to the decree, only priority areas would be funded from local budgets during the period of martial law in the region.

On 15 October, for the first time in 18 years, the railway connection between Lviv and Warsaw was resumed in the format of a change of train at Rava-Ruska station. The train stops in Lublin, and it is now possible to get to Warsaw from Ivano-Frankivsk, Stryi, Kolomyia, Kalush, Morshyn, Briukhovychi, and Zhovkva. In November 2024, Ukrzaliznytsia launched a second pair of trains on this route, adding the possibility of travelling to Chernivtsi via Ternopil, Chortkiv, and Zalishchyky. The Warsaw-Rava-Ruska section is operated by the Polish PKP Intercity, and the Rava-Ruska-Lviv-Chernivtsi route is operated by a modern Ukrainian-made diesel train DPKr-3.

At the end of the year, Lviv region became the first region in Ukraine to introduce cashless fare collection on suburban and intercity buses in all directions. Not a single penny was spent on the implementation of the e-ticket in Lviv region — neither from the state, nor from the regional, nor from local budgets. The project was funded by an investor, Smart Ticket Technology.

=== 2024 ===
In early 2024, Lviv region was the first in Ukraine to complete the process of decommunising public space. In the communities of the Lviv region, 312 Soviet monuments were dismantled, including monuments to Soviet soldiers, obelisks, figures of collective farmers and "grieving mothers". Most of these monuments were found in Lviv Raion (78), Sheptytskyi Raion (62) and Zolochiv Raion (51). The last object to be dismantled was a monument in the village of Kustyn, depicting a woman with a sword and dedicated to those killed during the "Great Patriotic War".

In 2024, the regional military administration under the leadership of Maksym Kozytskyi continued to focus its main efforts on supporting the Armed Forces of Ukraine. At the same time, a number of projects in the fields of education, medicine, culture, and energy were implemented in Lviv region during the year. In particular, Lviv region became the first in Ukraine to develop a network of training centres for blue-collar professionals. As of February 2024, there were 45 modern vocational training centres in the Lviv region.

In June, the Lviv region launched mass production of bunker wagons for the transport of grain and other bulk foodstuffs by rail. Every element of these wagons is made in Ukraine.

Since July 2024, the University Hospital (a branch of Danylo Halytskyi Lviv National Medical University), established on the basis of the railway hospital, has been fully operational in Lviv. The hospital provides outpatient, diagnostic and inpatient services. During the first month of operation, the hospital signed 3,500 patient declarations, provided outpatient services to 6,500 people and operated on more than 100 patients. Of the 280 inpatient beds, 215 are filled, and there are 10 inpatient departments and 22 structural units in total.

In August 2024, a museum of Ukrainian artist Volodymyr Patyk was opened in Lviv. The museum will house more than 100 graphic works, sketches, archives, and personal belongings of Volodymyr Patyk, which were donated by the artist's wife, Romanna Patyk. The Lviv regional authorities provided the museum with premises.

Also in August 2024, the Lviv region handed over a 10,000th drone to the military as part of the Birds of Victory project. The event was recorded as a record for Ukraine — the largest transfer of drones to our defenders within one project and from one region. The Birds of Victory charity project is being implemented under the patronage of the head of the Lviv Regional Military Administration, Maksym Kozytskyi. The founders are Ihor Dulyn, head of the NGO Dobro.Diy, and Oleksandr Tishchenko.

In September 2024, a wind farm was launched in the village of Oriv, Drohobych Raion, capable of covering about 5% of the region's electricity consumption. The total cost of the project is €75 million. It is a joint project of the Ukrainian company Eco-Optima and the Czech company MND. The construction of the wind farm began in September 2021 and was supposed to be completed in August next year, but was delayed due to Russian aggression. The Orov wind farm provides electricity to more than 45,000 households.

In the same month, during a regular meeting of the Chamber of Regions of the Congress of Local and Regional Authorities under the President of Ukraine, Maksym Kozytskyi was elected as the new chairman of the Chamber.

In addition, during a working visit to Italy, Maksym Kozytskyi received the Cassino for Peace international award from the community of the Italian commune of Cassino. The head of the Lviv Regional EMB took part in the International Conference of Ombudsmen, during which considerable attention was paid to the issue of the Russo-Ukrainian war.

On 21 December 2024, the Nyzhankovychi— Malhowice road crossing point in the Lviv region was launched, serving cars, buses and trucks up to 3.5 tonnes. It has a capacity of up to 4,000 cars and 100 buses per day in both directions. The checkpoint is equipped with six lanes for entry into Ukraine and four for exit.

In 2024, the Lviv Regional Psychiatric Hospital was renovated at the expense of the regional budget. The admission, medical and diagnostic, intensive care, and clinical diagnostic departments were renovated. In 2025, on the initiative of Maksym Kozytskyi, the hospital will receive UAH 200 million from the state budget to repair the ward stock.

In December 2024, Lviv region completed the implementation of an electronic document management system in municipal institutions of regional subordination. The implementation of the Megapolis.DocNet electronic document management system covered 59 municipal enterprises, institutions and establishments in Lviv region. This system provides a significant acceleration of document flow. In addition, all documents are stored in a secure digital environment, which minimises the risk of information loss or damage.

In 2024, the Lviv region fully completed the formation of a network of Diia.Centre and Administrative Service Centres (ASCs). The region has 60 ASCs and 13 Diia.Centre (ASCs with an expanded range of services). Now, residents of each of the 73 communities in the region can receive the necessary administrative services. The last, 13th Diia.Centre was opened in November 2024 in the village of Ivano-Frankove in Yavoriv Raion.

== Recognition ==
Introducing Maksym Kozytskyi the Governor of Lviv Regional State Administration during a visit to Lviv Oblast on 6 February, Zelenskyy described the newly appointed official as follows: "We have your man – a Lviv resident, Maksym Kozytskyi... He is an experienced, professional person. We were looking for a strong manager – here he is." Zelenskyy added that Kozytskyi will work closely and coordinate problematic issues in the sector with the newly appointed Deputy Prime Minister and Minister of Community and Territorial Development Denys Shmyhal, who also hails from Lviv.

== Personal life ==
He is married, and together with his wife Oksana Kozytska (who works at Lviv Medical University), he has two children – a daughter, Sofia, and a son, Zinoviy.
