= Government House, Minsk =

Government House
- Belarusian: Дом урада Russian: Дом правительства
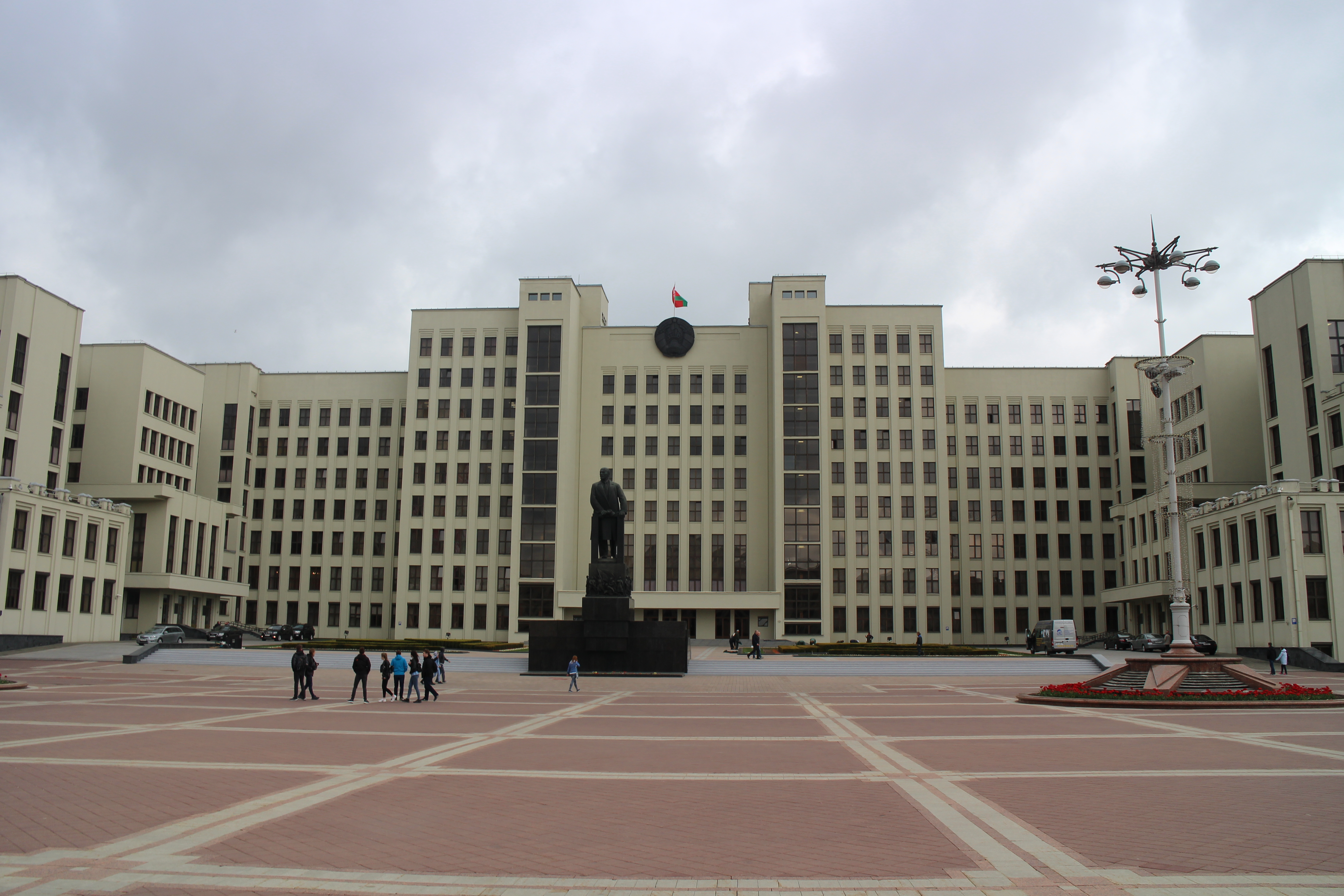
- Government House in 2019

General information
- Architectural style: Constructivism
- Location: Independence Square, Minsk, Belarus
- Coordinates: 53°53′46″N 27°32′41.2″E
- Construction started: 1930
- Completed: 1934; 92 years ago
- Owner: Government of Belarus

Design and construction
- Architect: Iosif Langbard

The Government House or House of Government (Belarusian: Дом урада, romanized: Dom urada; Russian: Дом правительства, romanized: Dom pravitel'stva) is a government building in Minsk, Belarus, located on Independence Square. It houses Belarus' parliament, the National Assembly of Belarus which consists of two chambers: the Council of the Republic and the House of Representatives (located in the right wing). It was built in 1934 and designed by Iosif Langbard. It stands behind a statue of Vladimir Lenin and is one of the few buildings in the city that survived the World War II.

== History ==
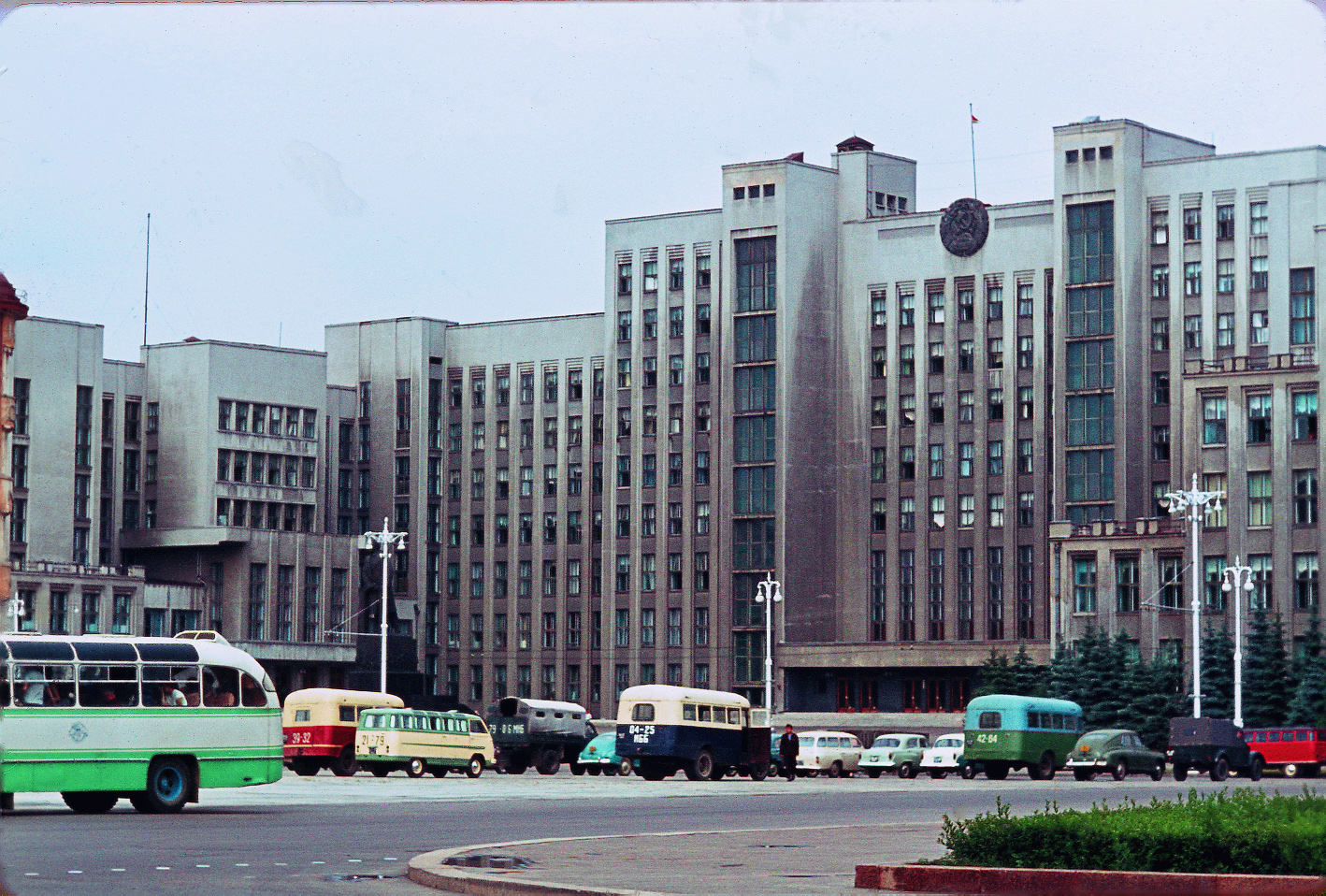
Government House in 1964

The Government House was built between 1930 and 1934, becoming a vivid example of the constructivism architectural style as the largest public building of the pre-war Belarusian SSR. In 1929, a competition for design of a new government workplace in Minsk took place, with the winner being Iosif Langbard, a native of the Grodno Region. The building was part of a project led by Langbard in that area which included a square (now known as Independence Square) used for civil/military parades on public holidays and a central grandstand for party leaders. He won the honorary title of Honored Artist of the Belarusian SSR as a result of his work. Busts of Karl Marx and Friedrich Engels were sculpted and installed on the sides of the stairs leading to the premises of the Supreme Soviet. At the request of Langbard, a statue to Russian statesman and revolutionary Vladimir Lenin was erected in front of the house and the square, becoming the tallest of its kind in the entire USSR.

During the German occupation of Belarus during World War II, the headquarters of the local Gestapo was housed at Government House. The statue of Lenin was toppled, leaving only a pedestal with bas-reliefs, and brought to Germany where it was melted. In 1945, the monument was restored after Victory in Europe Day using the original casting preserved in Leningrad. Between 1938 and 1940 the House of Soviets, a building identical to the Government House in Minsk, was bult in Mogilev due to the idea of moving the capital of the Byelorussian SSR to that city. The architect was once again Langbard. After the war the Mogilev City Council was seated there.

== Events held at Government House ==
=== First presidential inauguration ===
The first presidential inauguration was held in the halls of Government House, on 20 July 1994, exactly ten days after the 1994 Belarusian presidential election in which Alexander Lukashenko was declared president. A special meeting of the Supreme Soviet was held in the building Oval Hall of Parliament, where the white-red-white flag and the Pahonia coat of arms hanging in front of all. At exactly 10:00 in the morning, the ceremony began, with Lukashenko first taking oath of loyalty before delivering a short speech in Russian.

=== State of the Nation ===
The State of the Nation Address is an annual speech given by the Belarusian President to both houses of parliament outline the state of the Belarusian republic, similar to the American State of the Union speech.

== Gallery ==
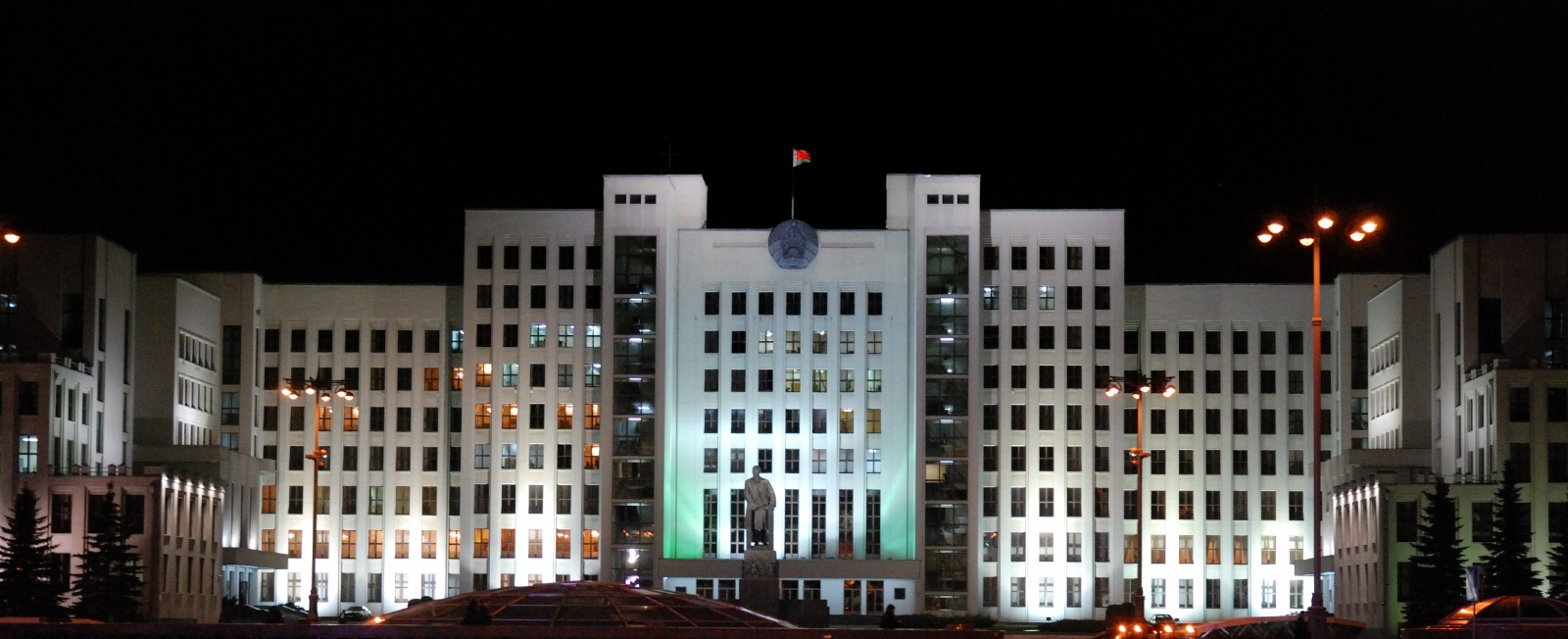
The Government House at night, 2006

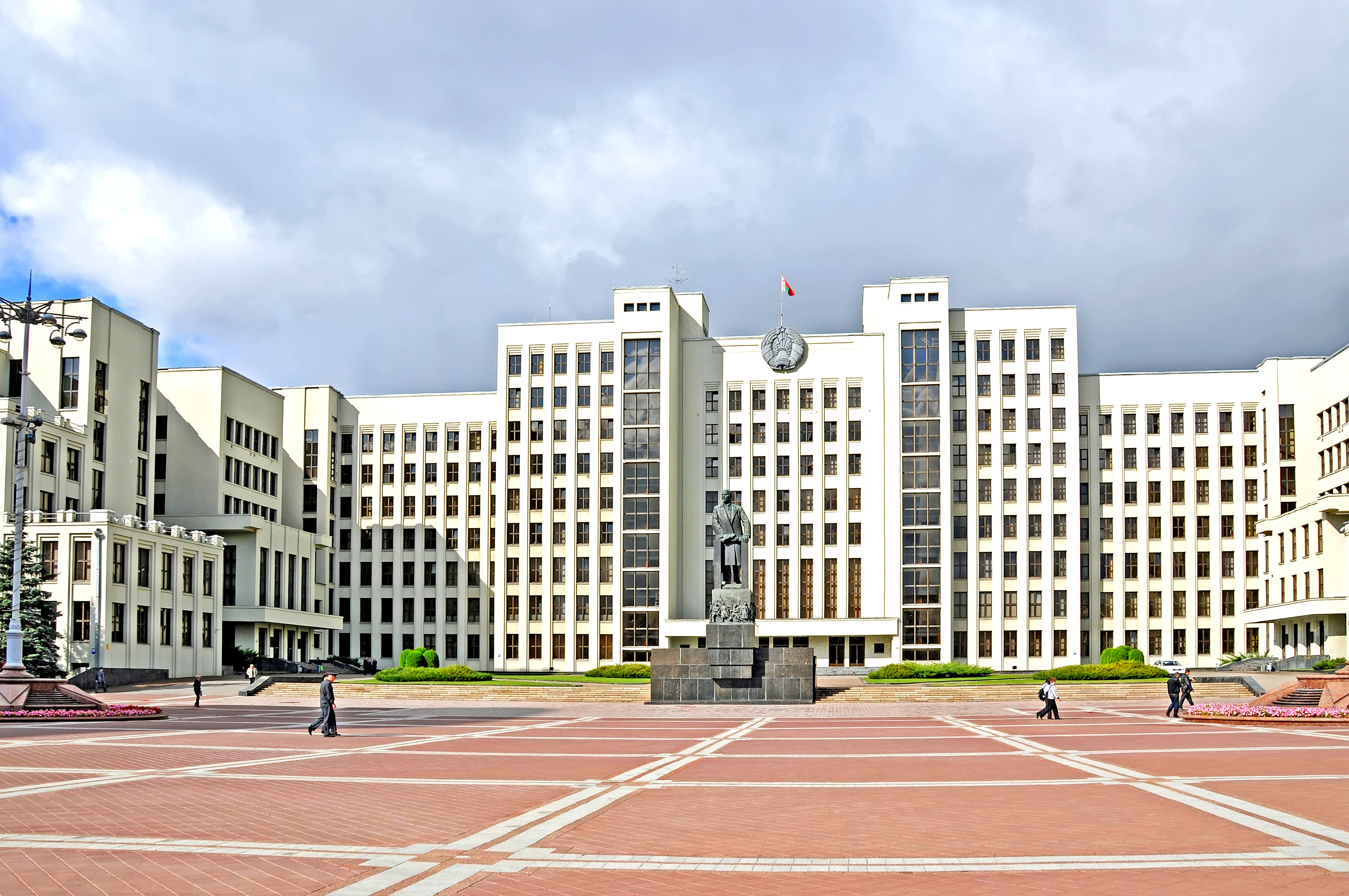
The building in 2009

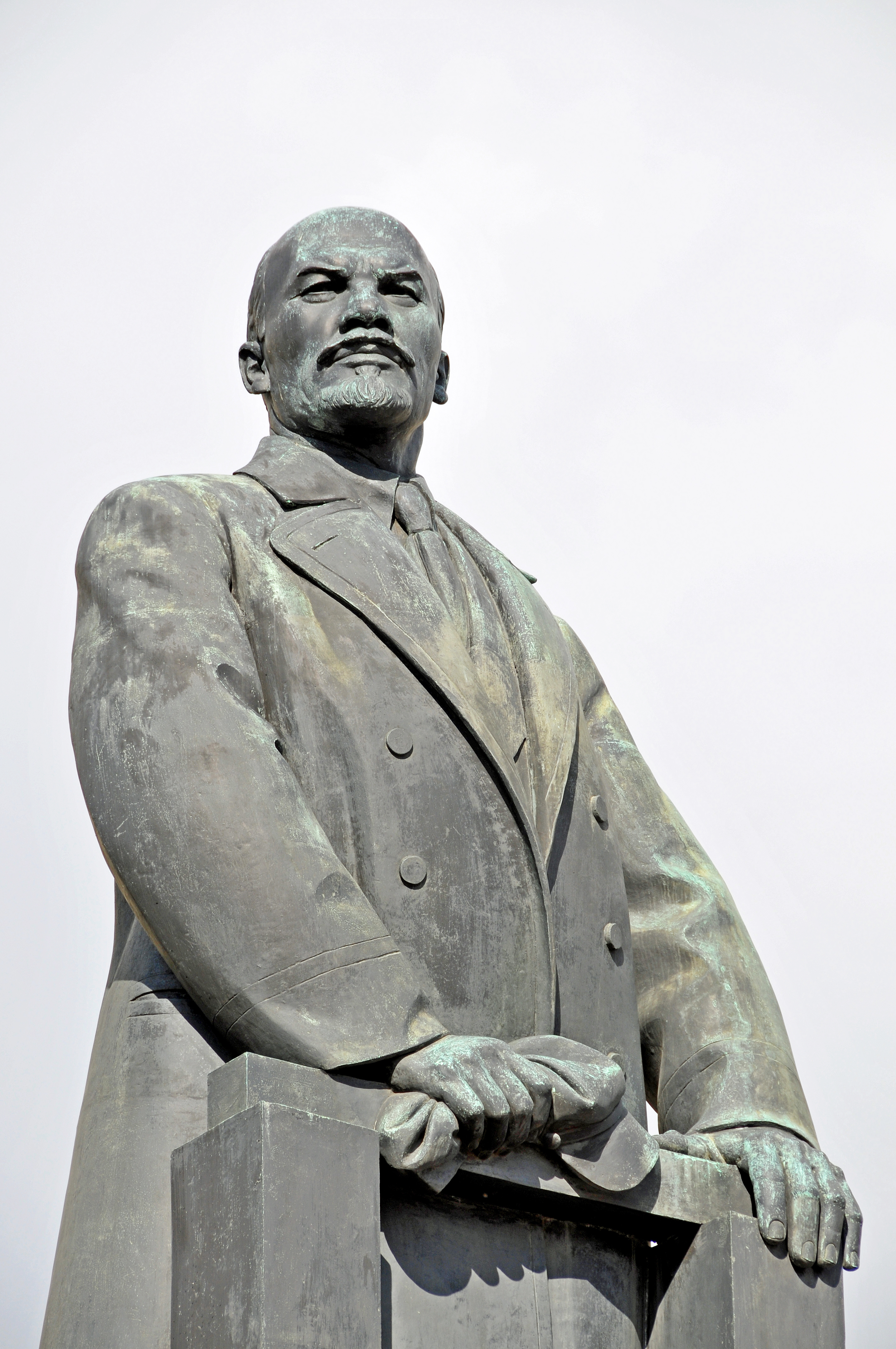
Statue of Vladimir Lenin

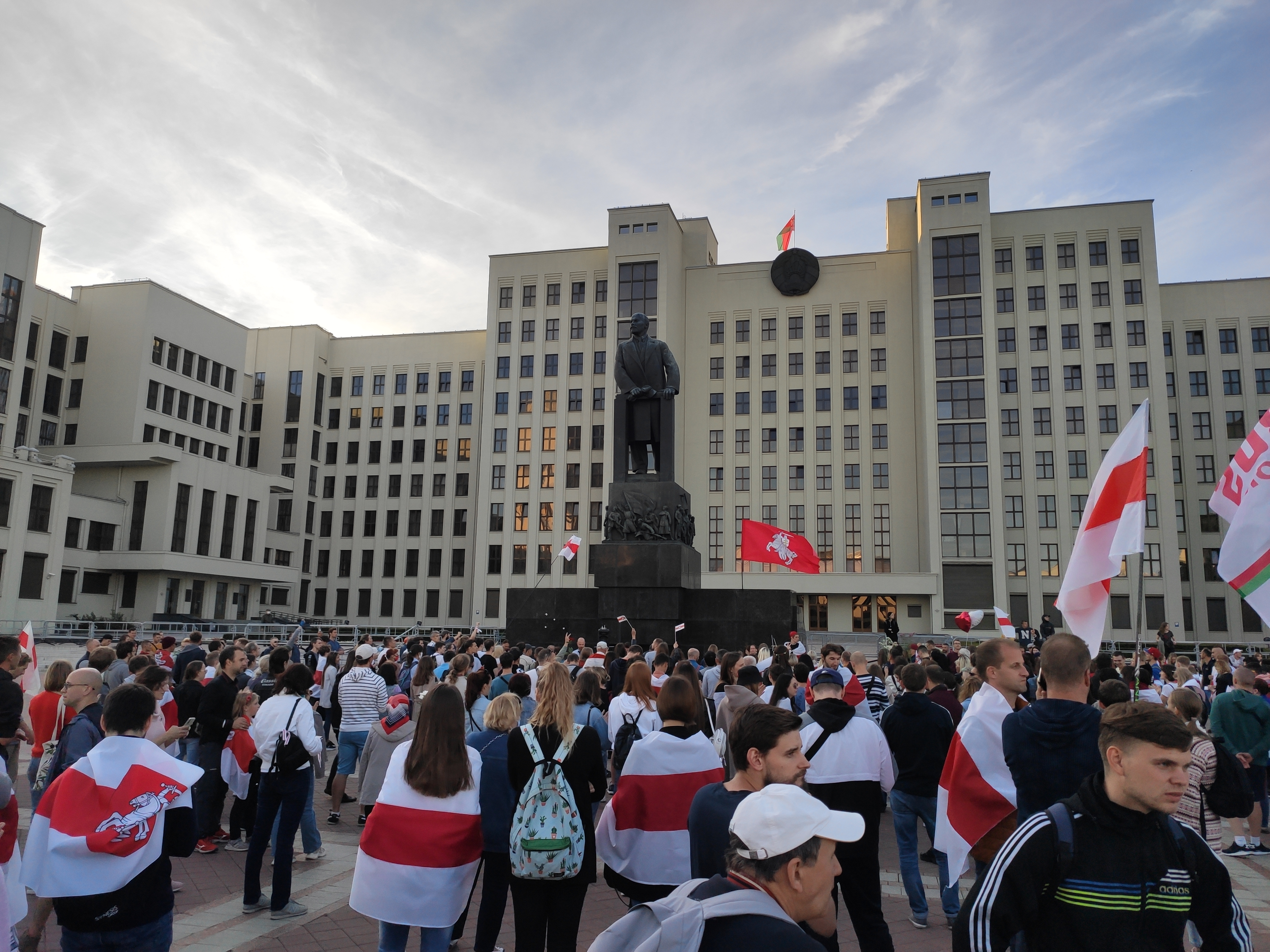
Protest against Alexander Lukashenko outside the Government House, 2020

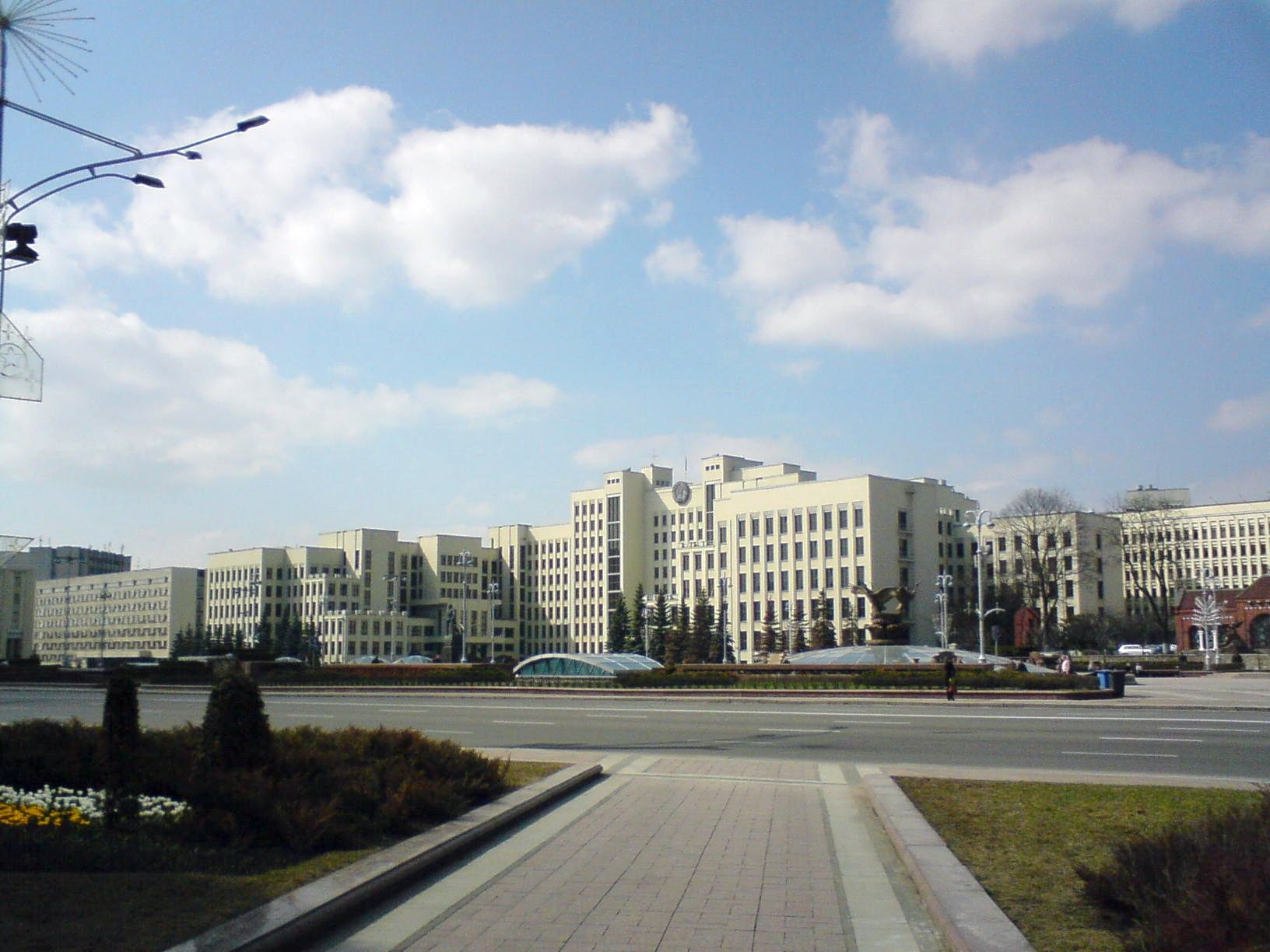

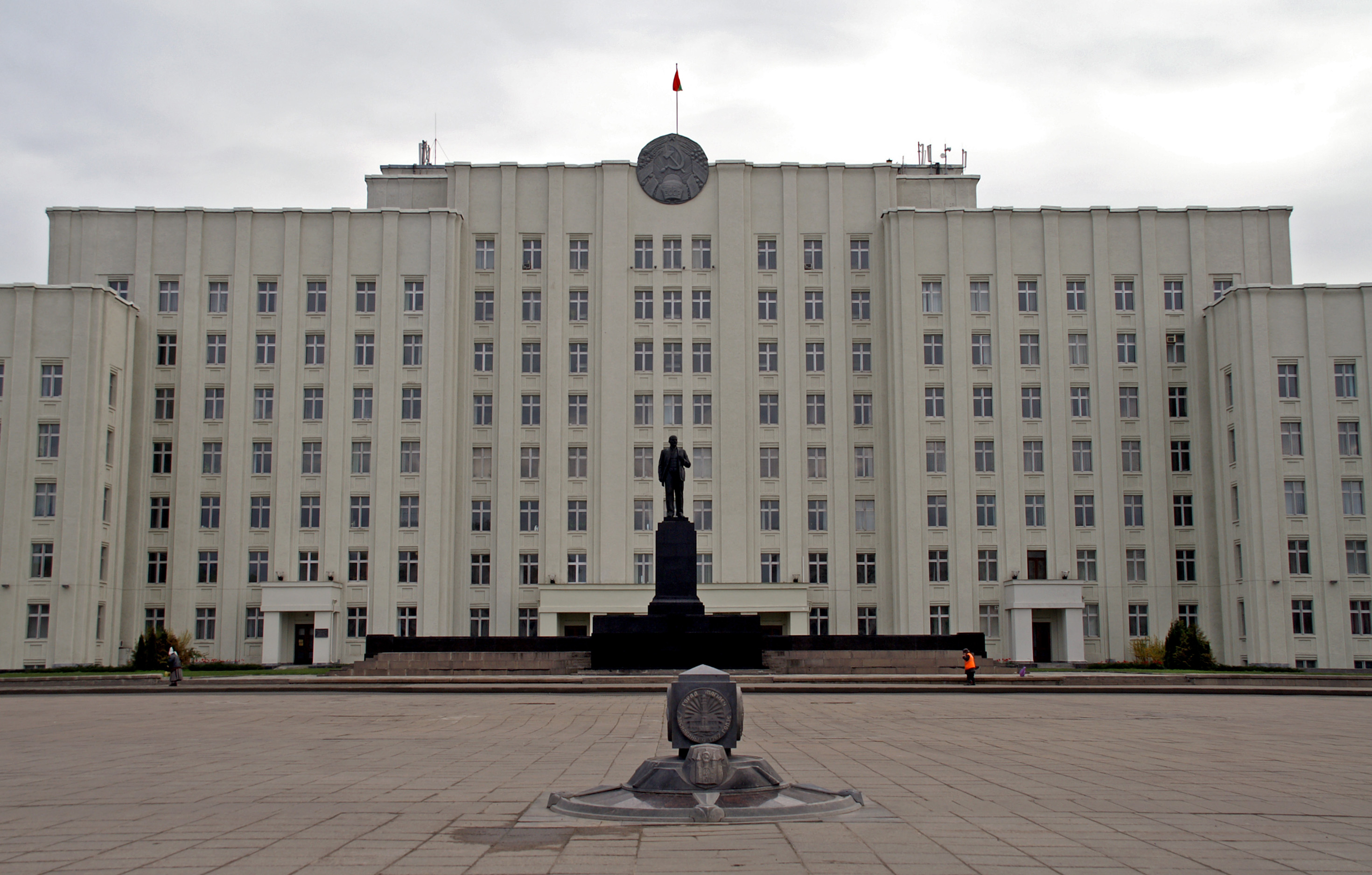
Building of the Mogilev City Council, based on the Government House, built between 1938–1940

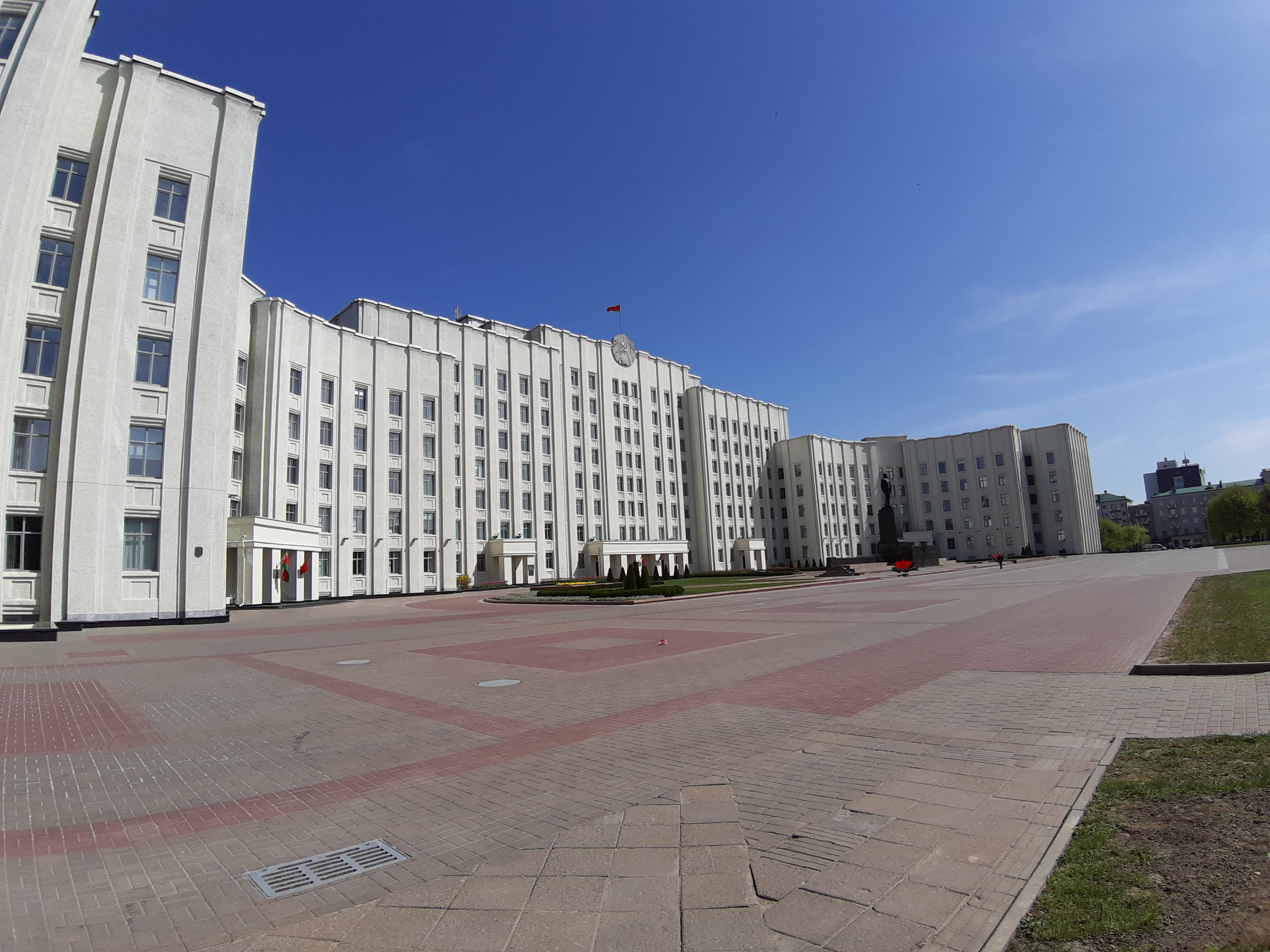
Another view of the House of Soviets in Mogilev

== See also ==
- House of Moscow Oblast Government
- Government House, Yerevan
- Government House, Lviv
- Independence Avenue
