= Mykola Horyn =

Ukrainian politician

- Микола Горинь

Governor of Lviv Oblast
- In office July 1994 – February 1997 (Note: Acting until 1995.)
- Preceded by: Stepan Davymuka
- Succeeded by: Mykhailo Hladii

Chairman of the Lviv Oblast Council
- In office 1992–1997
- Preceded by: Viacheslav Chornovil
- Succeeded by: Orest Furdychko

Personal details
- Born: 29 January 1945 (age 81) Kniselo, Ukrainian SSR, Soviet Union (now Ukraine)
- Party: People's Movement of Ukraine
- Other political affiliations: Our Ukraine Bloc
- Relatives: Bohdan Horyn (brother); Mykhailo Horyn (brother); Mykola Lebed (cousin, once removed)
- Education: Lviv Polytechnic

Mykola Mykolaiovych Horyn (Ukrainian: Мико́ла Микола́йович Го́ринь; born 29 January 1945) is a Ukrainian politician who served as chairman of the Lviv Oblast Council from 1992 to 1997 and as Governor of Lviv Oblast from 1994 to 1997. He is a member of the People's Movement of Ukraine, and the younger brother of politicians and Soviet dissidents Bohdan and Mykhailo Horyn.

== Early life and career ==
Mykola Mykolaiovych Horyn was born on 29 January 1945 in the village of Kniselo to a family of ethnically-Ukrainian peasants. Mykola Lebed was his cousin once removed, and his father died while fighting in the Ukrainian Insurgent Army. He is the younger brother of Bohdan and Mykhailo Horyn. Mykola studied at Lviv Polytechnic from 1963 to 1968, graduating in electrical engineering. He worked at SKTB Termoprylad from 1968 to 1990, aside from a year between 1969 and 1970, when he completed conscript service in the Soviet Army.

== Political career ==
Horyn served as deputy chairman of the Lviv Oblast Council from May 1990 to April 1992, serving under Viacheslav Chornovil. He subsequently succeeded Chornovil as chairman, serving until April 1997. Horyn additionally became acting Governor of Lviv Oblast in July 1994. He remained as such until 1995, when his authority to serve as governor was formalised by President Leonid Kuchma. Horyn left office in February 1997. Horyn was a member of the People's Movement of Ukraine, and he also partook in the commission that drafted the Constitution of Ukraine.

After leaving office in 1997, Horyn initially departed from politics, allowing his membership of the People's Movement of Ukraine to lapse. In 2004, however, amidst the presidential election, he rejoined politics to support the Our Ukraine Bloc and Viktor Yushchenko's presidential campaign. He was appointed as the Lviv coordinator for the Our Ukraine Bloc in March of that year. At the same time, Horyn described himself as apolitical, stating that a political comeback after the time he spent out of office was "practically impossible". Horyn also briefly returned to the Lviv Oblast Council as a deputy in 2006.

Horyn has also invested a significant sum of money in the development of Staryi Sambir Raion, and he owns a home in the raion.
