= Briukhovychi =

Rural settlement in Lviv Oblast, Ukraine

Briukhovychi Брюховичі
- Rural settlement
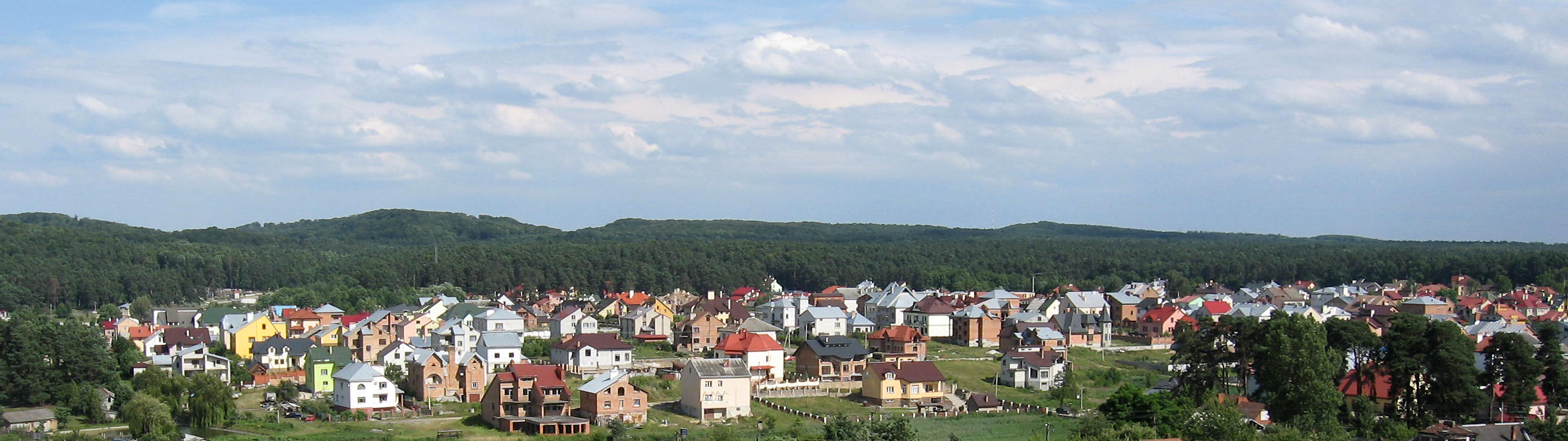
- Panorama of Briukhovychi

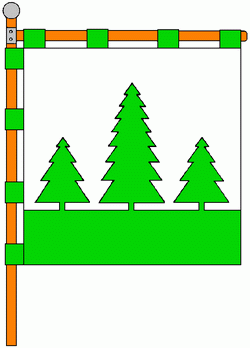
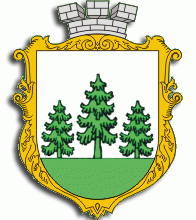
- Flag Coat of arms

- Location within Lviv Oblast Location within Ukraine
- Coordinates: 49°54′14″N 23°57′14″E
- Country: Ukraine
- Oblast: Lviv Oblast
- Raion: Lviv Raion
- Hromada: Lviv urban hromada
- Established: 1444

Area
  - Total: 11.2 km^{2} (4.3 sq mi)

Population (2022)
  - Total: 6,559
  - Density: 586/km^{2} (1,520/sq mi)
- Postal code: 79491
- Area code: (+380) 32

Briukhovychi (Ukrainian: Брюховичі; Polish: Brzuchowice) is a rural settlement in Lviv Raion, Lviv Oblast, Ukraine. It belongs to Lviv urban hromada, one of the hromadas of Ukraine. Between 1939 and 1942, and again from 1944 to 1957, Briukhovychi was the center of Briukhovychi Raion. Its population was 6,559 (2022 estimate).

== Location ==
Briukhovychi is located at the center of Lviv Oblast and is bordered on the south by the city of Lviv, in the northeast by the villages Mali Hrybovychi and Volia-Homuletska. To the west is the village of Birky in Yavoriv Raion.

Briukovychi is located at the intersection of the Sian Lowland and the Roztocze. The European Watershed passes through the southwestern part of the village.

== History ==
The foundation charter for the village of Briukhovychi was issued by Polish king Władysław III shortly before his death in the Varna Crusade of 1444. In 1600 a paper mill was founded in the area by the authorities of nearby Lviv. The city also owned local forests, mills and quarries and employed the inhabitants of the settlement and nearby villages in corvée labour.

Between 1774 and 1918 Briukhovychi was part of Austrian Galicia. Following the construction of a railway, starting from the 1880s the town started to develop as a recreational zone and became a climate resort. One of 11 forts defending Lviv was constructed near Briukhovychi in the late 19th century. Abandoned by both Austrian and Russian forces during World War I, it served as a major fortified position of Ukrainian forces during the Polish-Ukrainian War.

After the end of World War I Briukhovychi became part of Lwów Powiat in Lwów Voivodeship, part of Poland. In 1939 it was annexed by the Soviet Union. It was given the status of an urban-type settlement in 1940. Briukhovychi was occupied by German troops during World War II from 1941 to 1944. The nearby forest became an arena of fighting between German and Polish forces.

Until 2006, the elite 146th Command and Reconnaissance Center of the Headquarters of the Carpathian Military District (military unit 31996, A1590), the 30th separate battalion of the RChBZ (radiation, chemical and bacteriological protection) of the 24th Motor Rifle Division of the 13th Army of the Carpathian Military District were stationed in the Bryukhovychi forest. And on December 25, 2008, ammunition was removed from the 731st artillery warehouse of weapons and ammunition (military unit A3870) (military camp No 160), where more than 20 types of mines, shells and missiles were stored.

Until 18 July 2020, Briukhovychi belonged to Lviv Municipality. The municipality was abolished in July 2020 as part of the administrative reform of Ukraine, which reduced the number of raions of Lviv Oblast to seven. The area of Lviv Municipality was merged into the newly established Lviv Raion. On 26 January 2024, a new law entered into force which abolished the status of urban-type settlement, and Briukhovychi became a rural settlement.

== Points of interest ==
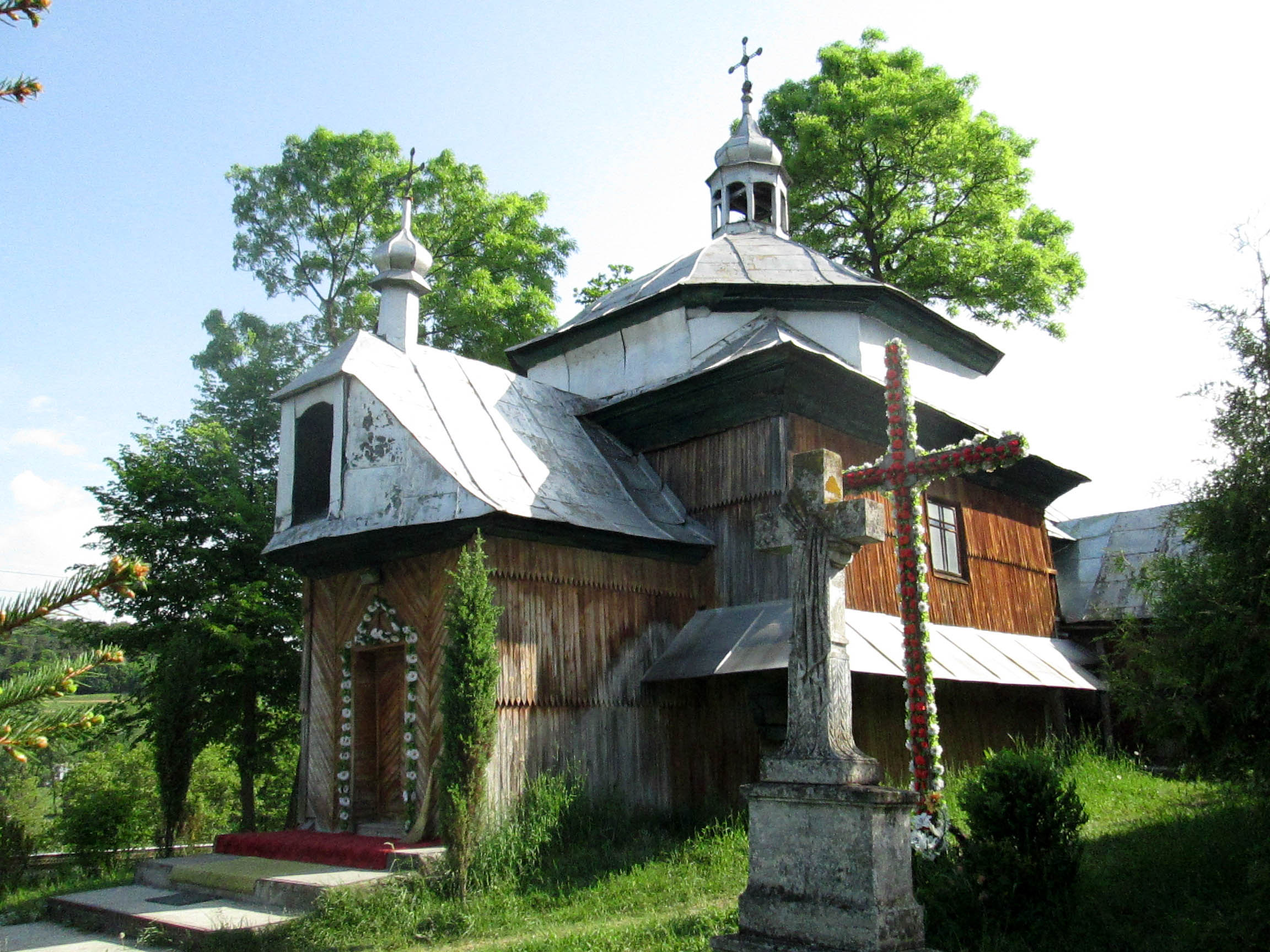
Holy Trinity church, Briukhovychi

One of Eastern Europe's oldest astronomical observatories has been functioning in Briukhovychi since the 18th century.

A reconstructed hideout of the Ukrainian Insurgent Army is located in a nearby forest.

Ukraine's only museum of modern sculpture is active in the town.

The Church of Holy Trinity, constructed in 1756, is an architectural monument of national importance and a unique example of a bicameral wooden church.

== Notable personalities ==
- Volodymyr Ivasiuk, Ukrainian composer and songwriter, body found in a nearby forest in 1979.
- Andriy Kuzmenko, Ukrainian musician, leader of Skryabin, buried here.
- Stepan Senchuk, Governor of Lviv Oblast (1999-2001), assassinated in Briukhovychi.
