= Petro Oliynyk =

Ukrainian miner and politician

- Петро Олійник
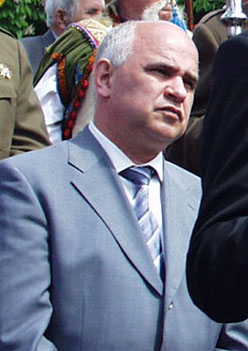

Governor of Lviv Oblast
- In office 2005–2008
- President: Viktor Yushchenko
- Preceded by: Bohdan Matolych (acting)
- Succeeded by: Mykola Kmit

People's Deputy of Ukraine
- In office 14 May 2002 – 2005
- Preceded by: Orest Furdychko
- Succeeded by: Constituency abolished
- Constituency: Lviv Oblast, No. 125

Personal details
- Born: 10 July 1957 Novovarvarovka, Primorsky Krai, Russian SFSR, Soviet Union (now Russia)
- Died: 10 February 2011 (aged 53) Austria
- Party: People's Movement of Ukraine; Communist Party of Ukraine
- Education: Dnipropetrovsk Mining Institute of Artyom

Petro Mykhailovych Oliynyk (Ukrainian: Петро Михайлович Олійник; 10 July 1957 – 10 February 2011) was a Ukrainian miner and politician who served as Governor of Lviv Oblast from 2005 to 2008. He previously served as a People's Deputy of Ukraine from Ukraine's 125th electoral district from 2002 to 2005. He was a member of the People's Movement of Ukraine.

In 1989-1999 he worked as a director for various companies including coal mining (i.e. the 50th Anniversary of the Soviet Union Mine) in Chervonohrad. Later he was a mayor of Chervonohrad.

In 2002-2005 Oliynyk was a member of Verkhovna Rada representing the People's Movement of Ukraine.

In 2005-2008 he served as Governor of Lviv Oblast.

In 2011 Oliynyk died in Austria where he was treated for serious illness.
