= Orest Furdychko =

Ukrainian forester and politician

Honoured Agricultural Worker Orest Furdychko
- Орест Фурдичко
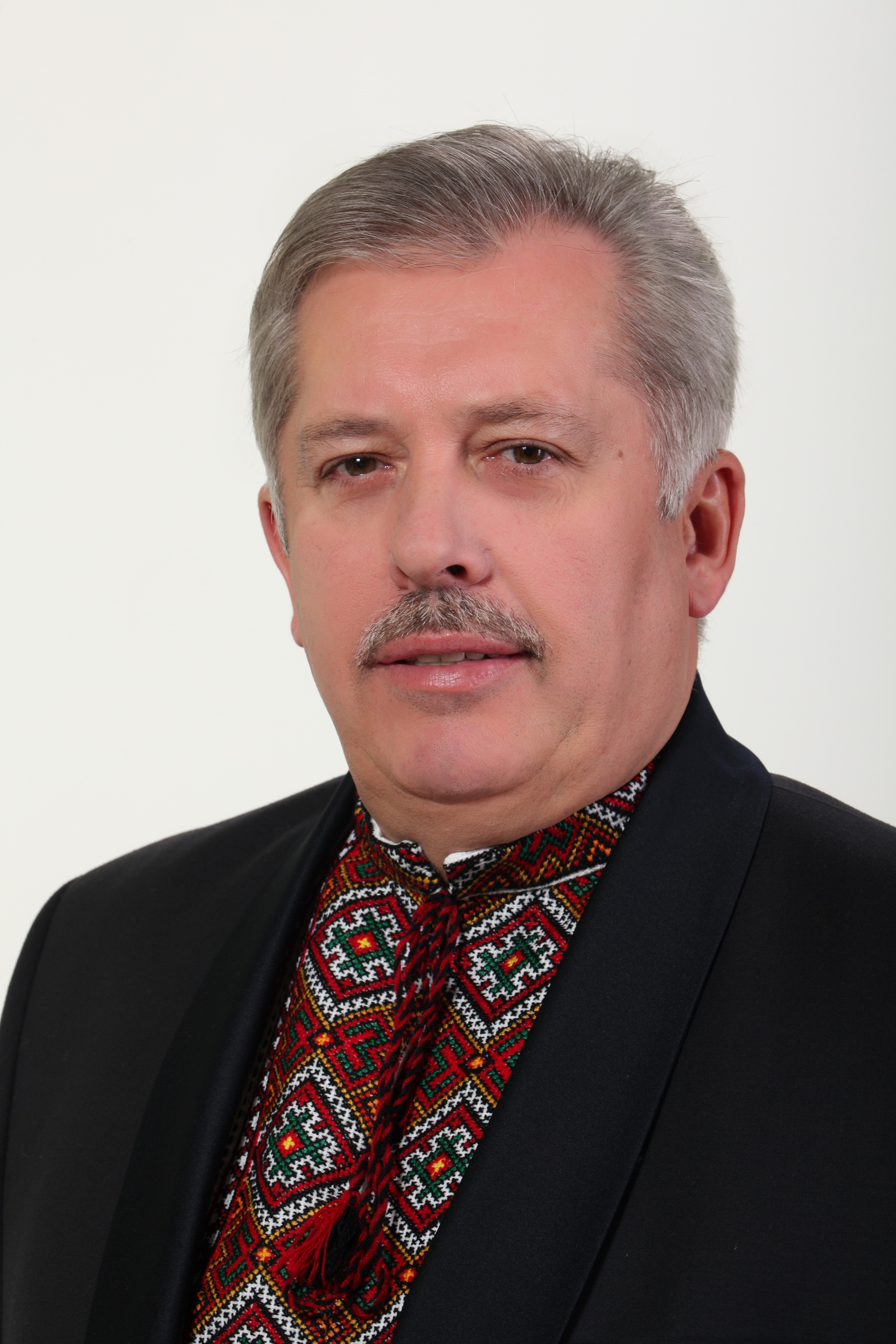
- Furdychko in 2012

Deputy Minister of Environmental Protection
- In office 17 August 2004 – 15 May 2005
- President: Leonid Kuchma; Viktor Yushchenko
- Prime Minister: Viktor Yanukovych; Yulia Tymoshenko
- Minister: Serhii Polyakov; Pavlo Ihnatenko

People's Deputy of Ukraine
- In office 29 March 1998 – 14 May 2002
- Preceded by: Constituency established
- Succeeded by: Petro Oliynyk
- Constituency: Lviv Oblast, No. 125

Chairman of the Lviv Oblast Council
- In office April 1997 – April 1998
- Preceded by: Mykola Horyn
- Succeeded by: Stepan Senchuk

Personal details
- Born: 10 October 1952 (age 73) Strilbychi, Ukrainian SSR, Soviet Union (now Ukraine)
- Party: Agrarian Party (until 1998)
- Other political affiliations: People's Democratic Party (1998–1999); Labour Ukraine (1999); Party of Regions; Democratic Union (2001); For United Ukraine!
- Education: Lviv Forestry Institute (DEkN)
- Criminal information
- Status: Convicted 30 July 2021
- Criminal charges: Extortion, bribery
- Penalty: Eight years' imprisonment

Orest Ivanovych Furdychko (Ukrainian: Орест Іванович Фурдичко; born 10 October 1952) is a Ukrainian forester and politician who served as People's Deputy of Ukraine from Ukraine's 125th electoral district, located in Lviv Oblast, from 1998 to 2002. Furdychko is also among Ukraine's leading academics on forestry, and previously served as a member of both the National Academy of Agrarian Sciences of Ukraine and the Academy of Forestry of Ukraine. Furdychko was charged with extortion and bribery in 2017 after a sting operation by the National Anti-Corruption Bureau of Ukraine. He was found guilty on 30 July 2021 and sentenced to eight years' imprisonment.

== Early life and career ==
Orest Ivanovych Furdychko was born on 10 October 1952 in the village of Strilbychi, in Ukraine's western Lviv Oblast. He studied at the Lviv Forestry Institute (now the Ukrainian National Forestry University) from 1970 to 1975, graduating with a specialisation in forestry engineering. He completed his thesis for a Candidate of Sciences degree in 1992, followed by his doctoral thesis in 1995. Throughout the 1970s and 1980s, Furdychko worked at multiple tree plantations managed by the government of the Soviet Union. He was appointed as chief forester of the Lviv Oblast Forestry in 1989, being appointed general director the next year. He was one of 19 people awarded the title of Honoured Agricultural Worker of Ukraine by President Leonid Kuchma on 12 September 1996.

== Academic career ==
Furdychko was a lecturer at the Lviv Forestry Academy from 1992 to 1997. He joined the Ukrainian Academy of Environmental Sciences in February 1993 and was active at the Western Scientific Centre in Lviv. His primary interest in academics was forestry practices in the Ukrainian Carpathians, including expanding sustainability in the economy. Furdychko authored nine monographs and 45 scientific articles, and he was also an adviser to the government of Ukraine on green economy policies and forestry. As of 2021, he was a professor at the Institute of Agroecology and Nature Management, part of the National Academy of Agrarian Sciences of Ukraine. For his academic activities, President Petro Poroshenko awarded him the Order of Prince Yaroslav the Wise in 2017.

== Political career ==
Furdychko was first elected to the Lviv Oblast Council in 1990. He became chairman of the Oblast Council in April 1997. During the 1998 Ukrainian parliamentary election he was elected as a People's Deputy of Ukraine from Ukraine's 125th electoral district, located in Lviv Oblast, as a member of the Agrarian Party. He subsequently resigned from the Oblast Council in April 1998. He was deputy chairman of the Committee of the Verkhovna Rada on issues of ecological policy. Furdychko's campaign was hit by a scandal after a local news outlet revealed that it had been funded by government tree plantations in Lviv Oblast.

During his time in office, Furdychko changed parties several times. He defected from the Agrarian Party to the People's Democratic Party in May 1998, remaining as a party member until he joined Labour Ukraine in April 1999. Furdychko would in turn leave Labour Ukraine for Regional Revival (later the Party of Regions) eight months later, briefly defecting to the Democratic Union in July 2001 before rejoining Regional Revival, by then known as Regions of Ukraine, in November of the same year. Newspaper Ukrainska Pravda claimed in 2012 that Furdychko was an organised crime boss in his electoral district, with a local legend stating that he had a staff of 400 enforcers in the region. He was also noted for his fierce rivalry with fellow forester Anatolii Deineka, a supporter of Our Ukraine who Furdychko accused of privatising forests to the benefit of his family.

Furdychko was defeated in the 2002 Ukrainian parliamentary election while running in Ukraine's 126th electoral district as a candidate of For United Ukraine!. He was also a candidate in the 2006 Ukrainian parliamentary election from Borys Oliynyk's coalition, but he was not elected.

Furdychko was deputy chairman of the State Forest Agency of Ukraine from 23 May 2002 to 17 August 2004. He was also deputy Minister of Environmental Protection from 17 August 2004 to 18 May 2005, with a portfolio involving relations with the Verkhovna Rada (parliament of Ukraine).

== Bribery trial ==
Furdychko was arrested by agents of the National Anti-Corruption Bureau of Ukraine in a sting operation on 30 December 2017, along with an accomplice. According to the NABU Furdychko received a bribe of US$300,000, having demanded $500,000. He was originally placed in pre-trial detention with a bail of ₴3 million. Anti-corruption non-governmental organisation Chesno, citing the NABU, later said that this bribe was taken with the promise not to interfere with a businessman's development of lands owned by the National Academy of Agrarian Sciences.

After a three-year trial, Furdychko was found guilty of extortion and bribery on 30 July 2021 by the High Anti-Corruption Court of Ukraine and sentenced to eight years' imprisonment. An appeal was rejected on 6 June 2022. Anti-corruption activist and lawyer Vadym Valko celebrated Furdychko's sentencing as one of the most significant victories in the Ukrainian anti-corruption movement in 2021.
