= Iosif Langbard =

Belarusian architect (1882–1951)

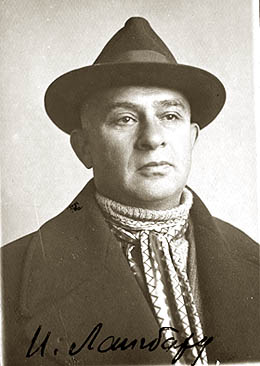
Iosif Langbard

Iosif Grigor’evich Langbard, also Josef Langbard (Russian: Ио́сиф Григо́рьевич (Ги́ршевич) Ла́нгбард; 6 January 1882 – 3 January 1951) was a Soviet Belarusian architect and Honored Artist of the Byelorussian SSR (1934).

Born in Bielsk Podlaski (Grodno Governorate), Langbard studied architecture at the Grekov Odessa Art school in 1901 and then St. Petersburg Academy of Arts (1907–1914), and later returned there to teach becoming a professor from 1939 to 1950. He was the architect of many of most important Soviet-era buildings in Minsk. Langbard also worked on buildings in Kyiv after it became the Ukrainian capital, such as the building of the Ministry of Foreign Affairs of Ukraine. He died in Leningrad.

== Works ==
- Monument to Taras Shevchenko

=== Gallery ===
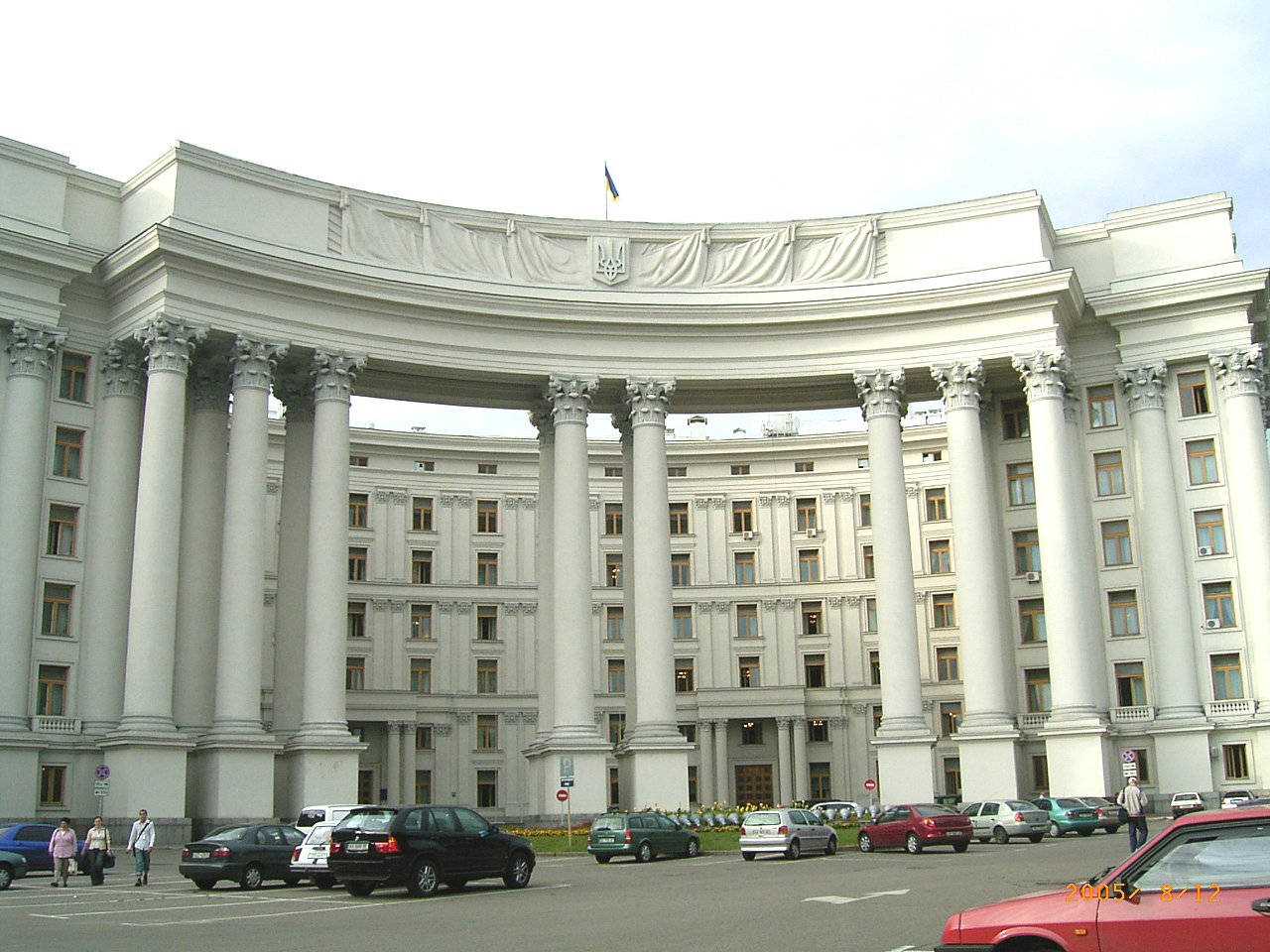
Foreign Ministry, Kyiv

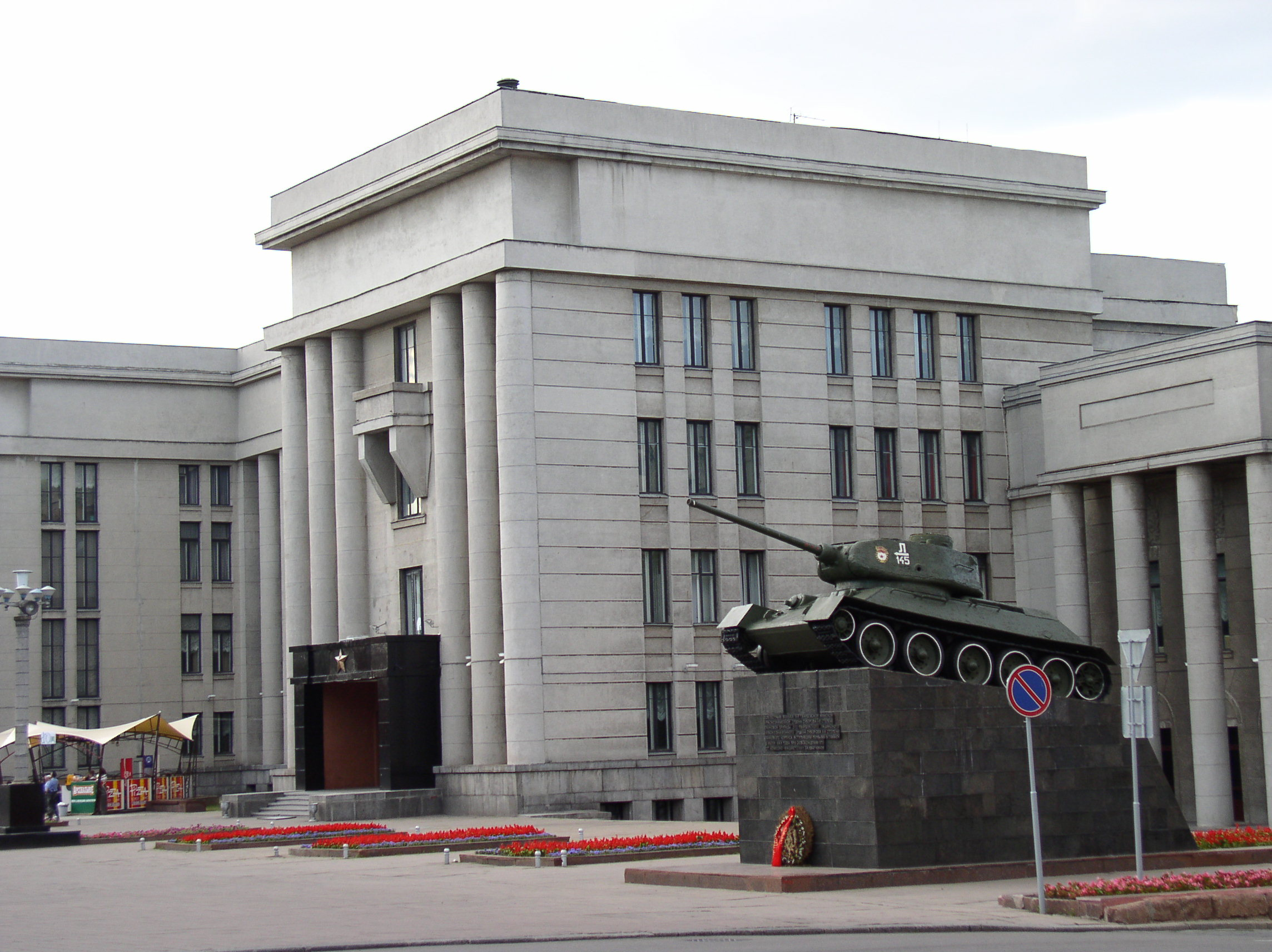
Officers' House, Minsk

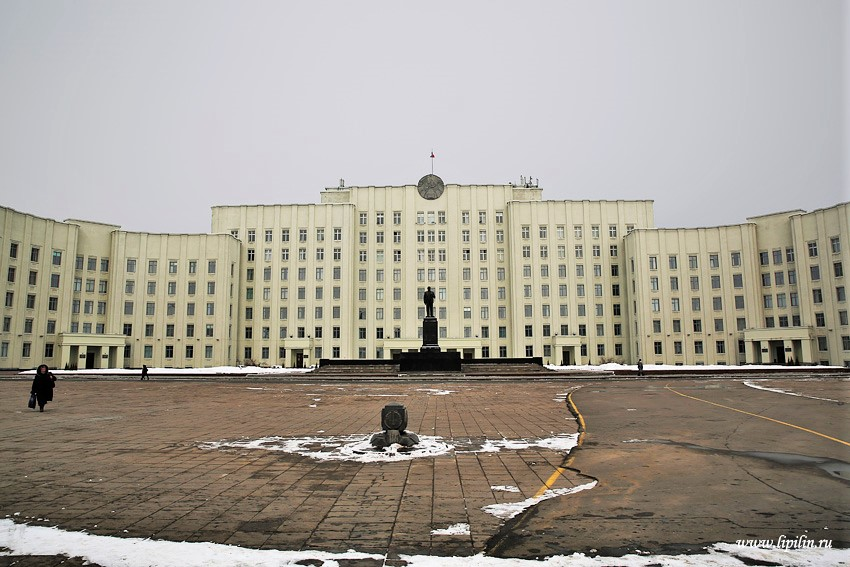
Oblispolkom, Mogilev

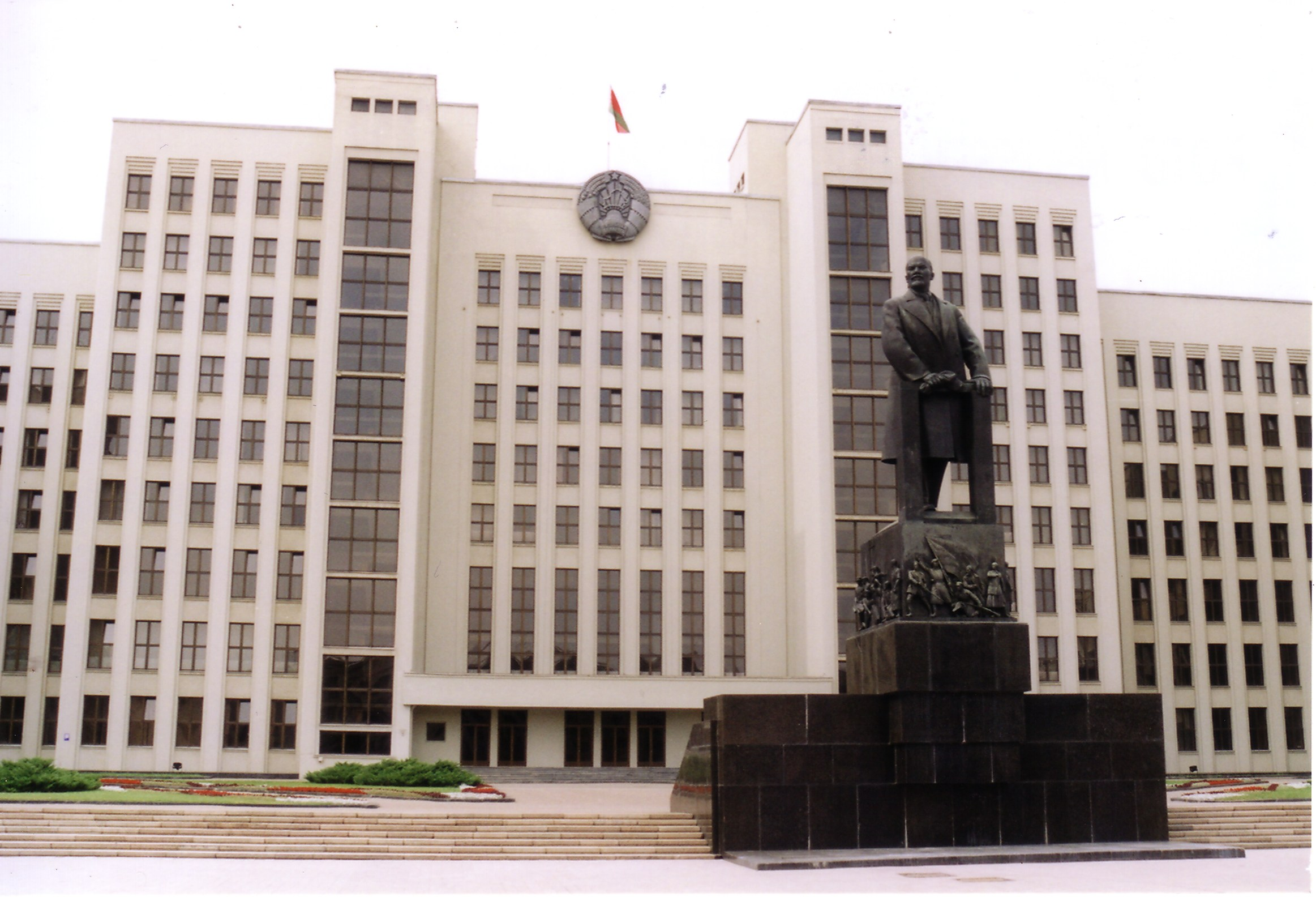
Government House, Minsk

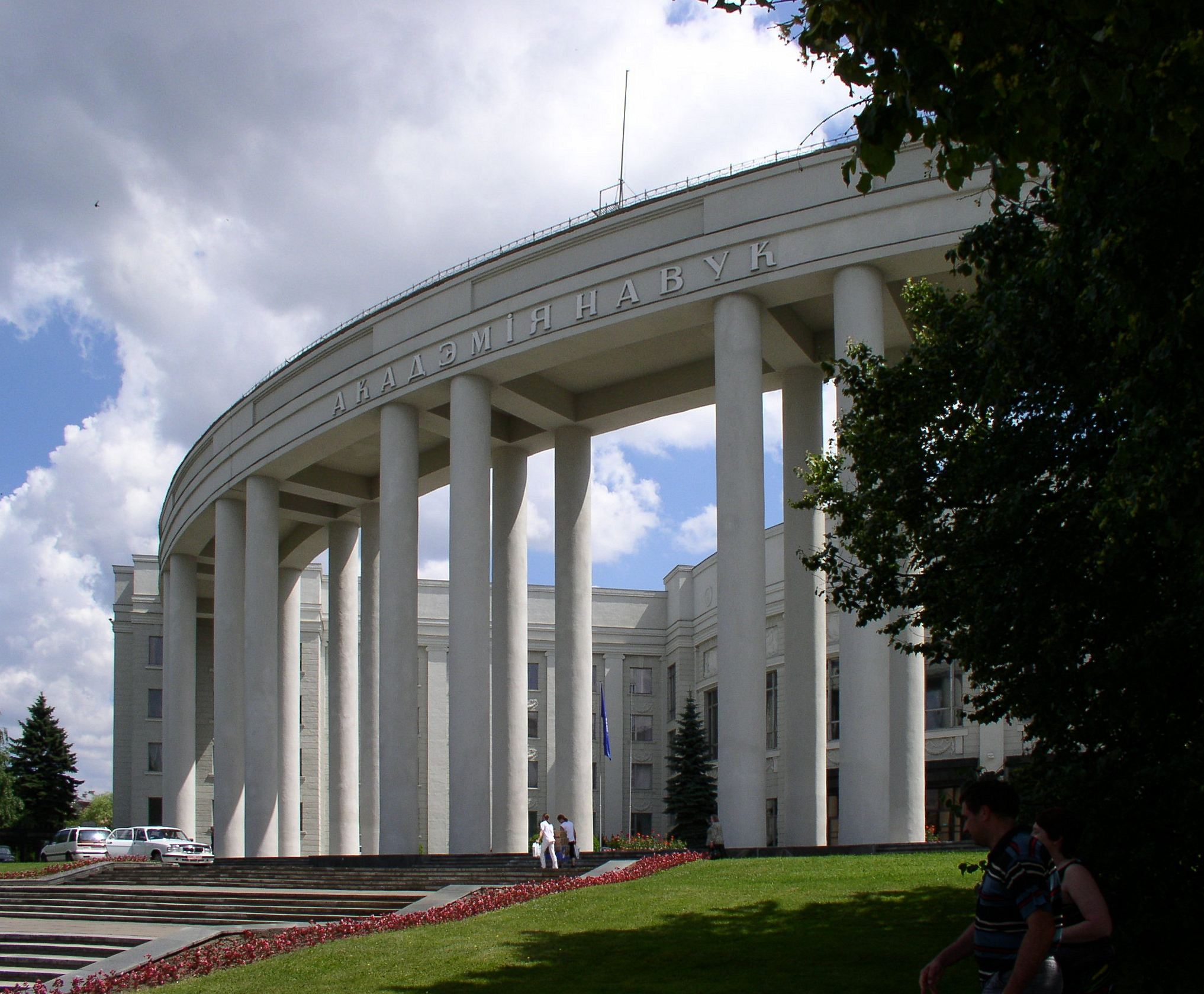
Belarusian Academy of Sciences, Minsk

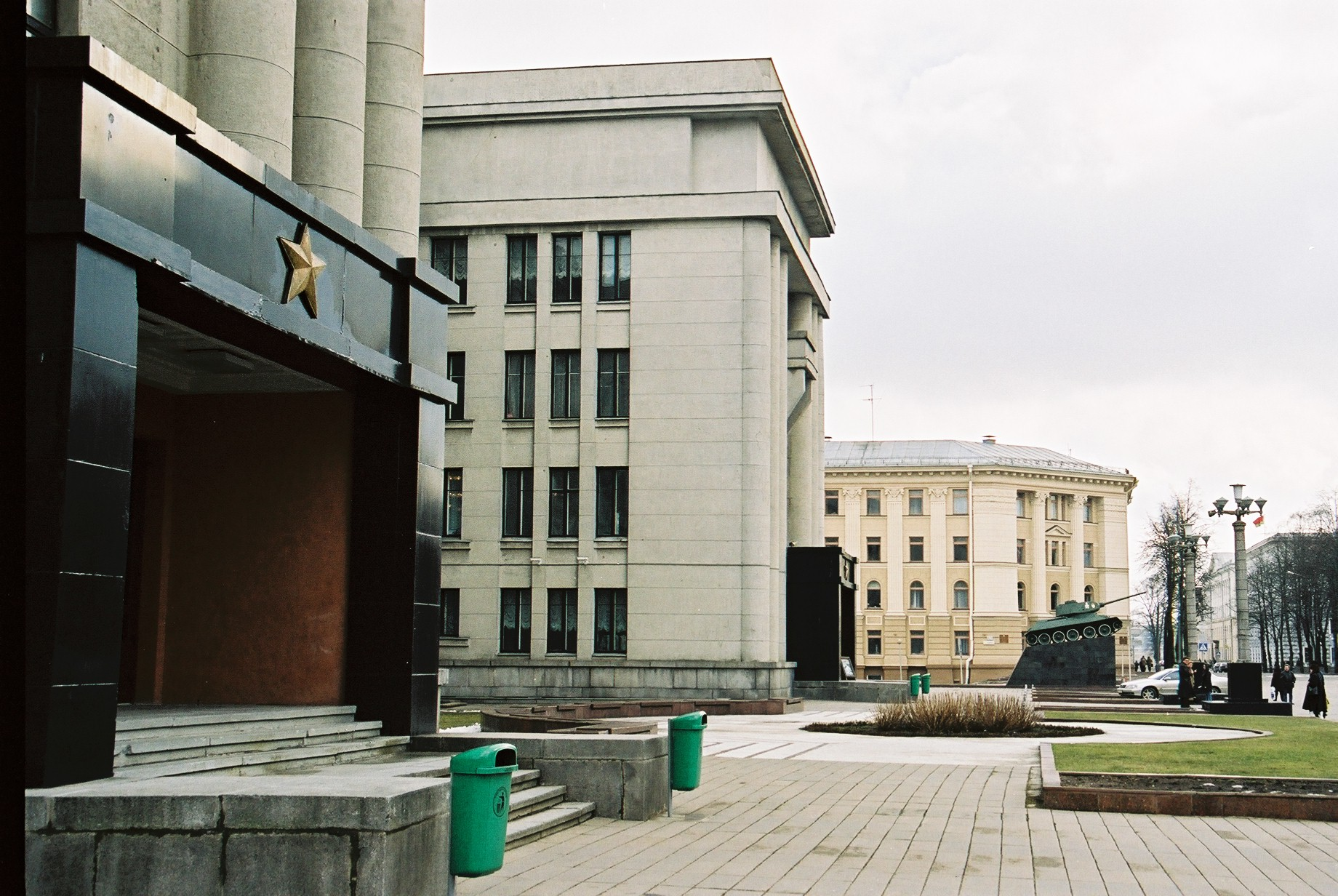
Officer's House, Minsk

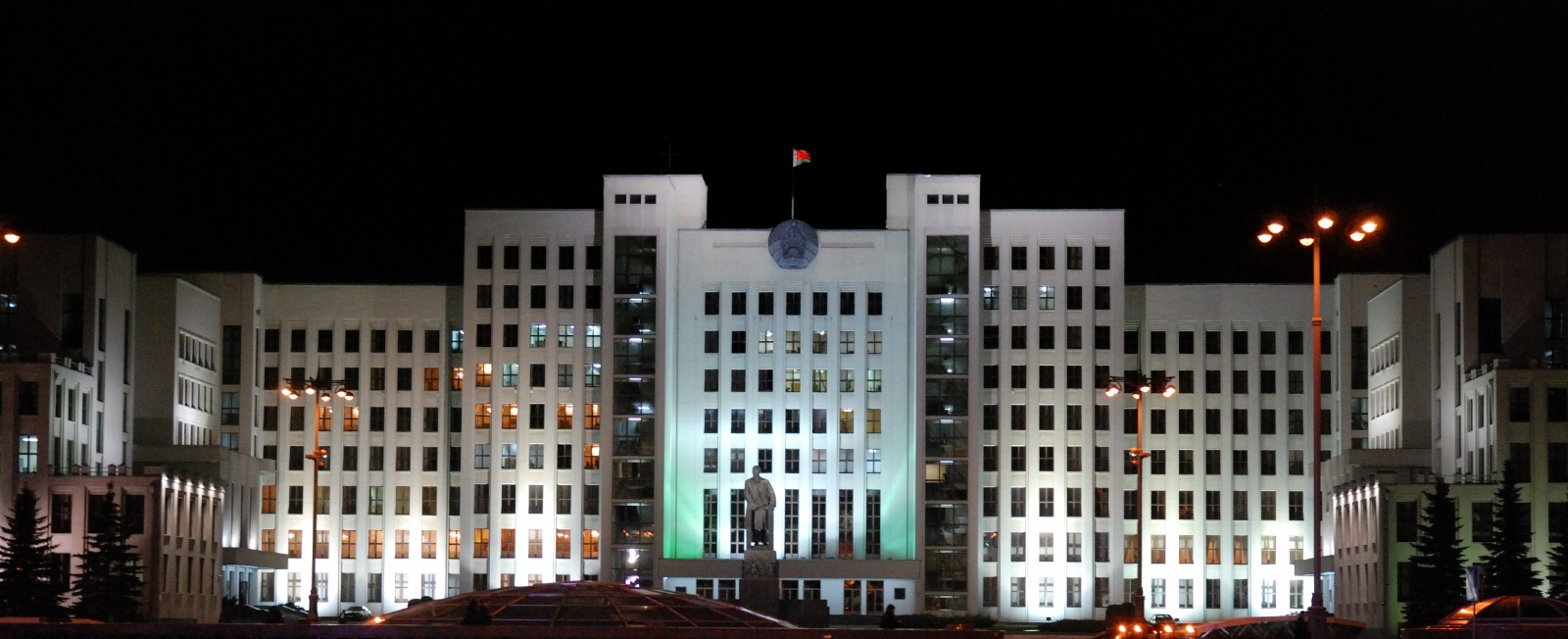
Government House, Minsk

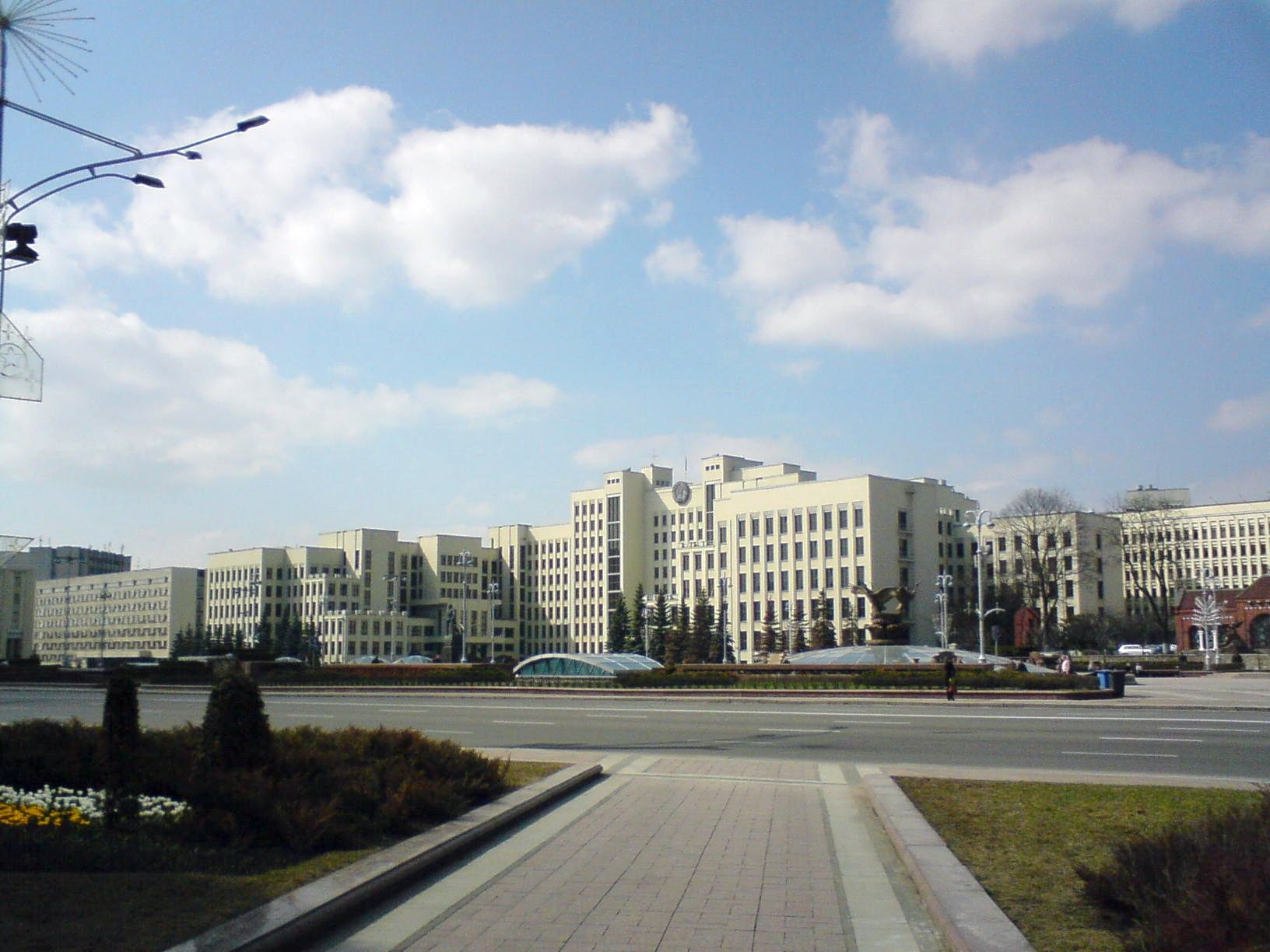
Government House, Minsk

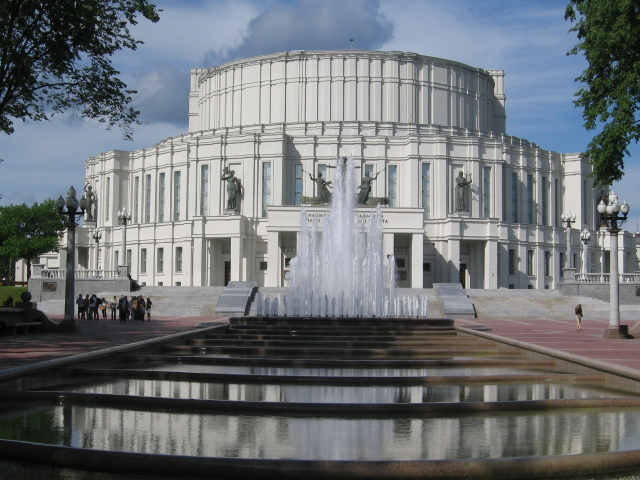
National Opera and Ballet Theatre, Minsk
