= Markiyan Malsky =

Ukrainian politician

- Маркіян Мальський
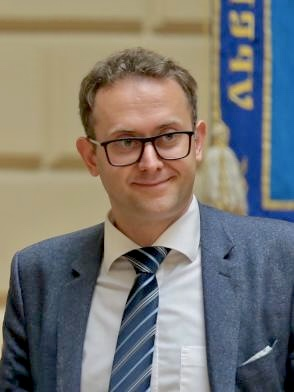

Governor of Lviv Oblast
- In office 5 July 2019 – 26 December 2019
- President: Volodymyr Zelenskyy
- Prime Minister: Volodymyr Hroysman; Oleksiy Honcharuk
- Preceded by: Oleh Synyutka
- Succeeded by: Maksym Kozytsky

Personal details
- Born: Markiyan Markiyanovych Malsky; 11 December 1984 (age 41) Lviv, Ukrainian SSR, Soviet Union
- Party: Independent
- Education: University of Lviv; Stockholm University; World Trade Institute; Taras Shevchenko National University of Kyiv
- Occupation: lawyer politician

Markiyan Markiyanovych Malsky (Ukrainian: Маркіян Маркіянович Мальський; born 11 December 1984) is a Ukrainian lawyer and politician. He was Governor of Lviv Oblast (from 5 July till 26 December 2019).

== Biography ==
He is the son of the diplomat Markiyan Malsky.

== Education ==
From 2001 to 2006, he studied at the University of Lviv, where he obtained Master of International Economic Relations and Master of Law diplomas. He also studied at Stockholm University in Sweden (LL.M. in international commercial arbitration, magna cum laude) and at the World Trade Institute in Bern, Switzerland (Master of International Law and Economics, summa cum laude). In 2012, Malskyy received a PhD in law from the Taras Shevchenko National University of Kyiv, with his thesis "Arbitration agreement as a precondition of dispute resolution in international commercial arbitration". He obtained a PhD hab. degree in law in September 2020.

He was an assistant at the Lviv Polytechnic.

== Career ==
=== Legal career ===
Before joining Arzinger, Malskyy worked as a lawyer in the international arbitration team at Freshfields Bruckhaus Deringer in Paris. He has been head of Arzinger's Western Ukrainian branch in Lviv since 2009.

He has vast experience in resolving corporate disputes in the energy sector, contractual disputes, sales and services, real estate and construction disputes, enforcement of foreign judgments and arbitral awards, real estate and M&A transactions. He was engaged in the settlement of over 300 disputes, including under the ICSID, ICC, SCC, UNCITRAL, LCIA and ICAC rules.

From 2016 to 2019, he was the honorary consul of Austria in Lviv. He was renewed as honorary consul of Austria in Lviv in October 2020.

=== Public service ===
In 2014, he won a public competition for the post of the head of the main department of the State Fiscal Service in Lviv region. After the interview with Roman Nasirov, Malskyy declined the offer because of differences in the vision of the development and goals of the Fiscal Service.

In June 2019, President Volodymyr Zelenskyy nominated Malskyy as candidate for the post of the head of the Lviv Regional State Administration (LODA) for public discussion. At first, Malsky refused, saying that he did not want to leave the post of honorary consul of Austria and that he was working on his doctoral thesis, but after receiving great support in public discussion, he agreed.

On 5 July 2019, Zelenskyy officially appointed Malsky to the post of head of the LODA and, on December 24, during a meeting of the Community and Territories Development Council, announced his dismissal from office. Malsky also announced his dismissal on social media and briefly summarized the results of his work during his term as the head of LODA. He was officially dismissed from the post on 26 December 2019.

== Membership ofprofessional organizations and associations ==
- International Bar Association
- American Bar Association
- Chartered Institute of Arbitrators
- Young International Arbitration Group at London Court of International Arbitration
- Institute for Transnational Arbitration
- Young Austrian Arbitration Practitioners
- Swiss Arbitration Association (ASA below 40)
- International Centre for Dispute Resolution (ICDR Young & International)
- Belgian Centre for Arbitration and Mediation (Cepani 40)
- ICC Young Arbitrators Forum
- Ukrainian Bar Association
- Association of Attorneys of Ukraine
- Ukrainian Arbitration Association (board member in 2012–2019, board adviser since March 2020 )

Recommended arbitrator:

- Vienna International Arbitral Centre
- International Commercial Arbitration Court at the Ukrainian Chamber of Commerce and Industry
- Arbitration Court attached to the Czech Chamber of Commerce and the Agricultural Chamber of the Czech Republic
- Arbitration Center of Mexico
- Nowy Tomyśl Chamber of Commerce (Poland)
- China International Economic and Trade Arbitration Commission
- Recommended arbitrator in the financial restructuring procedure pursuant to the Law of Ukraine "On Financial Restructuring"

== Publications ==
He is the author of four books, more than 100 scientific papers and more than 300 articles and commentaries.

Books:

- Recognition and enforcement of foreign arbitral awards in Ukraine - 2007, p. 259;
- Adverse inference in WTO law and other dispute settlement fora - 2008, p. 260;
- Arbitration Agreement. Theoretical and Practical Aspects - 2013, p. 374;
- International enforcement process. Theory and Practice - 2019, p. 470.

== Private life ==
He is married to Dr. Malska Andriana, assistant professor in the Department of Pediatrics and Medical Genetics at Danylo Halytsky Lviv National Medical University, with three sons.

Malskyy speaks Ukrainian, Russian, English, German and Polish, with a basic knowledge of French.
