= Stepan Senchuk =

Ukrainian politician (1955–2005)

- Степан Сенчук

Chairman of the Lviv Oblast Council
- In office 14 April 1998 – 5 July 2001
- Governor: Mykhailo Hladii; Himself
- Preceded by: Orest Furdychko
- Succeeded by: Yaroslav Hadzalo

Governor of Lviv Oblast
- In office 15 January 1999 – 19 March 2001
- President: Leonid Kuchma
- Preceded by: Mykhailo Hladii
- Succeeded by: Mykhailo Hladii

Personal details
- Born: 23 March 1955 Prokopyevsk, Kemerovo Oblast, Russian SFSR, Soviet Union (now Russia)
- Died: 29 November 2005 (aged 50) Briukhovychi, Ukraine
- Cause of death: Assassination by shooting
- Party: Our Ukraine (2005)
- Other political affiliations: Agrarian Party
- Education: Lviv Agricultural Institute

Stepan Romanovych Senchuk (Ukrainian: Степан Романович Сенчук; 23 March 1955 – 29 November 2005) was a Ukrainian politician from Our Ukraine political party who was Governor of Lviv Oblast from 1999 to 2001. He was also chairman of the Lviv Oblast Council from 1998 to 2001. He was assassinated in 2005, allegedly for his business activities.

== Background ==
He was born in the city of Prokopyevsk in Kemerovo Oblast, Russia. Senchuk studied at the Lviv Agricultural Institute (now the Lviv National Environmental University) from 1972 to 1977, specialising in engineering and mechanics. From 1977 to 1993, Senchuk was on engineering and supervising posts at different agricultural enterprises. From 1993 onwards, he was general director of Lvivagroremmashpostach, a Lviv Oblast state-owned enterprise.

He was a deputy of the Lviv Oblast Council from 1994 to 1998, where he headed the Agrarian Party. From March 1997 to April 1998, Senchuk was the vice president of the Lviv-region state administration for agriculture and foodstuffs. On 14 April 1998, he was selected to be the chairman of the Lviv Oblast Council.

On 15 January 1999, Senchuk was appointed Governor of Lviv Oblast; for some time he combined two posts. On 19 March 2001 he was dismissed from the post of chairman of the state administration. On 5 July 2001 he also retired from the post of regional council chairman.

Since 2005, Senchuk was a member of the Our Ukraine party and a delegate of its constituent congress. Most recently he held a post at a chapter of the supervisory council of the Lviv corporation Ecolan (a food manufacturer).

== Death ==
Senchuk was shot dead on 29 November 2005 at 19:20 in his car, in the urban-type settlement of Briukhovychi. According to Radio Free Europe/Radio Liberty, Ukrainian media speculated that Senchuk was killed for his business activities. After his death, the chief policeman for the region, Vitaliy Maksymov, said that the entire police force in the area would work to solve the case within a month or two, although the case was not solved. Senchuk was later buried in Lviv at Lychakiv cemetery after a ceremony at Potocki Palace attended by his relatives along with around a thousand a half people who gathered.

== See also ==
- List of unsolved murders (2000–present)
