= Government House, Lviv =

Coordinates: 49.841556°N 24.03719°E

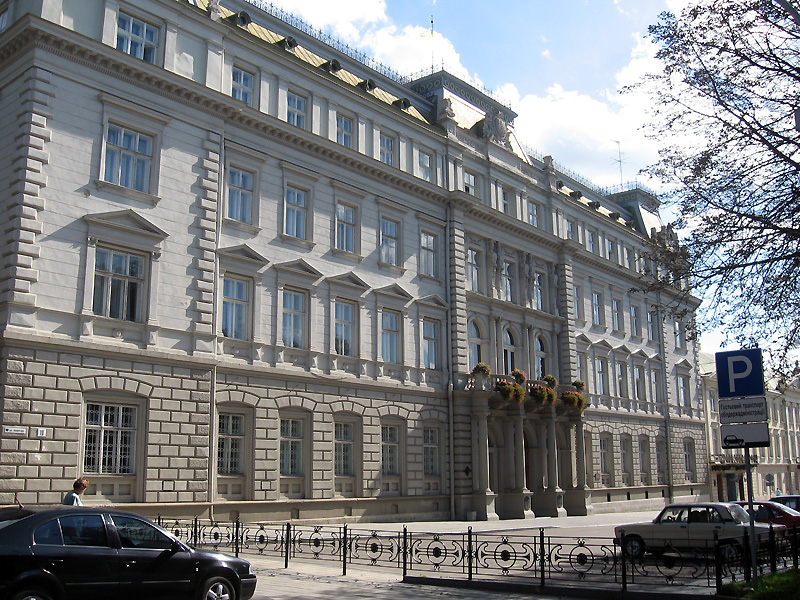
The building's facade

House of the Galician Viceroyalty (Ukrainian: Будинок Галицького намісництва, Polish: Pałac Namiestnikowski) or Government House is an architectural monument of national significance in Lviv (Ukraine). The building is an example of the Neo-Renaissance style of the Austrian-Hungarian Empire from which the Kingdom of Galicia and Lodomeria was ruled. It was erected in the 1870s to a design by architects Sylwester Hawryszkiewicz and Feliks Księżarski. Today the building serves as seat of the Lviv Regional Council and Lviv Regional State Administration.

== Location ==
The building is located beyond the eastern border of the medieval city and occupies a corner area, with its facade facing Vynnychenka Street on the west, and Prosvita Street—on the north. The Governor's Palace adjoins the building on the southern side. On the northern side, behind Prosvita Street, there is the Barefoot Carmelite Church. There is a small square with a monument to Vyacheslav Chornovil (Chairman of the Lviv Regional Council in the early 1990s) in front of the house. Address: 18 Vynnychenka Street (in the Austro-Hungarian period—Governor's Valley Street, in the interwar period—Charnetsky Street, during the Nazi occupation—District Strasse, under the Soviets—Soviet Street).

== History ==
This monumental building was erected in 1870–1878 by architects Feliks Księżarski and Sylwester Hawryszkiewicz. During the First World War, it housed the headquarters of the 8th Russian Army. In the interwar period, the Polish Voivodship Administration was located here, during the Nazi occupation—administration of the Governor of the Halychyna District. On April 28, 1943, the edifice witnessed an official ceremony of the inauguration of SS Division Galicia that was attended by representatives of the authorities, the National Socialist Party, the German army, former soldiers of the Ukrainian Galician Army, the press; well-known Ukrainian statesmen Viktor Kurmanovych and Volodymyr Kubiyovych were present too.

During the Soviet period, the Communist administration decided to retain the building's former function by assigning it to a local obkom.

Currently, the administrative building at 18 Vynnychenka Street houses divisions of the executive staff of the Lviv Regional Council, departments and divisions of the Lviv Regional State Administration, and a representative office of the Ministry of Foreign Affairs of Ukraine.

== Architecture ==
The house is rectangular in plan, with a closed courtyard, has four storeys and ends with a mansard roof. The facades are rusted and symmetrical, divided vertically by small protrusions, horizontally—by strips of cornices. On the main facade, the central axis is accentuated by a second-floor balcony, which stands on four columns flanking the main entrance.

The house has an office-corridor planning system. The complex of interiors is dominated by the grand staircase (architect Sylwester Hawryszkiewicz, sculptor Leonard Marconi).

Nowadays, the building is equipped with a special wheelchair lift.

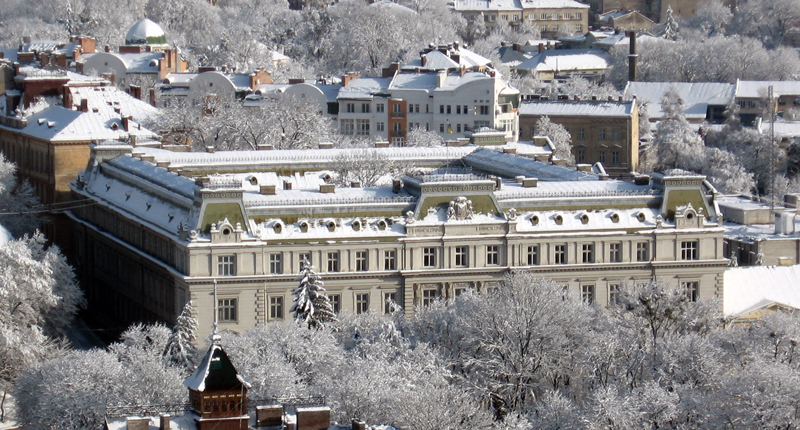
View from the town hall

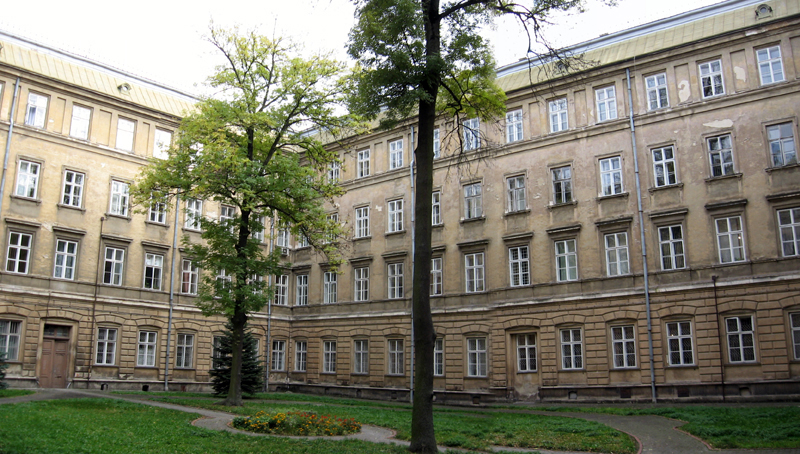
The courtyard
