= Lviv Oblast Council =

Legislature of Lviv Oblast, Ukraine

Lviv Oblast Council Львівська обласна рада
- 8th convocation

Type
- Type: Unicameral

Leadership
- Chairman: Yurii Kholod (acting), Servant of the People since 30 June 2023
- 1st Deputy Chairman: Yevhenii Hirnyk (Note: On 30 June 2023, Hirnyk submitted a resignation letter, but the Oblast Council did not support it, de facto keeping him as the First Deputy Chairman.), Independent since 4 December 2020
- Deputy Chairman: Vacant since 30 June 2023

Structure
- Seats: 84
- Political groups: European Solidarity (27); Servant of the People (9); Self Reliance (9); Holos (7); Batkivshchyna (6); Svoboda (6); Rukh (6); For the Future (6); Ukrainian Galician Party (5); Independent (1); Vacant (2)

Elections
- Last election: 25 October 2020

Meeting place
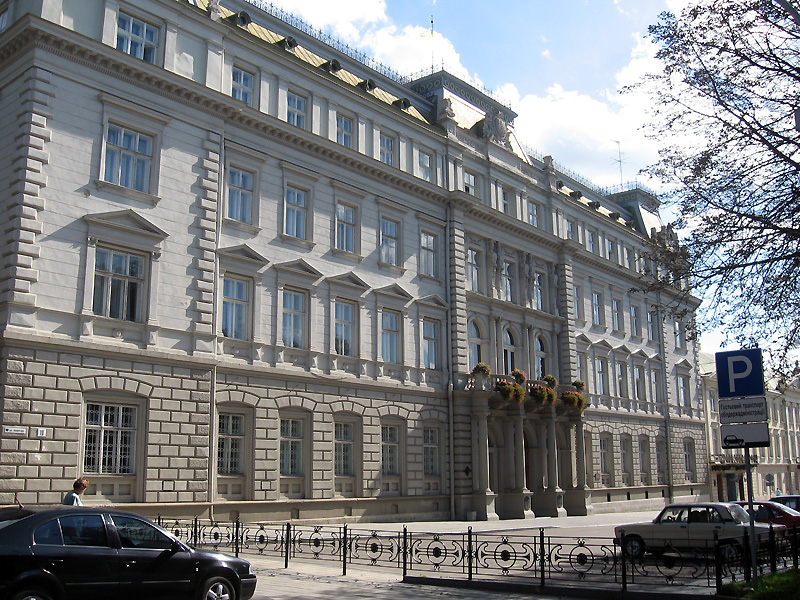
- Government House, Lviv, Lviv Oblast

Website
- https://lvivoblrada.gov.ua/

The Lviv Oblast Council or Lviv Regional Council (Ukrainian: Львівська обласна рада) is the regional council (parliament) of the Lviv Oblast (region) located in western Ukraine.

== Legislative framework ==
The Regional Council is a local self-government body representing the common interests of territorial communities of villages, towns and cities within the powers defined by the Constitution of Ukraine and Ukrainian Law On Local Self-Government in Ukraine.

== Composition and work procedure ==
The Lviv Regional Council consists of 84 members who are elected by Lviv Region residents on the basis of universal, equal and direct suffrage. Council members are elected for a five year term. In order to gain representation in the Council, a party must gain more than 5 percent of the total vote.

The Council meets in regular and extraordinary sessions. The session is plenipotentiary if more than a half of its members (at least 43) participate in the meeting.

== Recent elections ==
=== 2020 ===
Distribution of seats after the 2020 Ukrainian local elections

- 28 European Solidarity
- 9 Servant of the People
- 9 Self Reliance
- 7 Fatherland
- 7 Voice
- 6 Svoboda
- 6 Rukh
- 6 Ukrainian Galician Party
- 6 For the Future

Election date was 25 October 2020

=== 2015 ===
Distribution of seats after the 2015 Ukrainian local elections

- 20 Solidarity
- 14 Self Reliance
- 12 Svoboda
- 9 Fatherland
- 8 Civil Position
- 6 UKROP
- 5 Radical Party
- 5 People's Movement "People's Control"
- 5 Rukh

Election date was 25 October 2015

== Chairmen ==
=== Regional executive committee ===
- Nikolai Kozyrev (1939–1940)
- Pyotr Timchenko (1940–1941)
- Nikolai Kozyrev (1944–1949)
- Kuzma Pelekhaty (1949–1952)
- Pyotr Mirgorodsky (1952, acting)
- Pyotr Kozlanyuk (1952–1954)
- Semyon Stefanik (1954–1963)
- Fyodor Koval (1963–1964; industrial)
- Semyon Stefanik (1963–1964; agrarian)
- Semyon Stefanik (1964–1969)
- Timofey Telishevsky (1969–1979)
- Pyotr Shavkov (1979–1980, acting)
- Mikhail Kirei (1980–1990)
- Stepan Davimuka (1990–1991)

=== Regional council ===
- Viacheslav Chornovil (1990–1992)
- Mykola Horyn (1992–1997)
- Orest Furdychko (1997–1998)
- Stepan Senchuk (1998–2001)
- Yaroslav Hadzalo (2001–2002)
- Mykhailo Sendak (2002–2006)
- Myroslav Senyk (2006–2010)
- Oleg Pankevych (2010–2012)
- Petro Kolodiy (2012–2015)
- Oleksandr Hanushchyn (2015–2020)
- Iryna Hrymak (2020–2023)
- Yevhenii Hirnyk (acting, 2023)
- Yurii Kholod (acting, since 2023)
