= Bohdan Horyn =

Ukrainian human rights activist and politician (born 1936)

Bohdan Horyn Shevchenko National Prize laureate
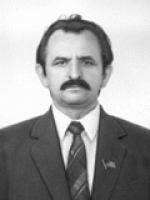

People's Deputy of Ukraine
- In office 1990–1998

Personal details
- Born: Bohdan Mykhailovych Horyn; 10 February 1936 (age 90) Kniselo, Lwów Voivodeship, Second Polish Republic
- Party: People's Movement of Ukraine; Republican Christian Party
- Spouse: Oksana (b. 1939)
- Education: Lviv University
- Occupation: Human rights activist, politician
- Profession: journalist, philologist
- Awards

Bohdan Horyn (Ukrainian: Богдан Миколайович Горинь; born 10 February 1936) is a Ukrainian human rights activist and dissident. He was a People's Deputy of the first and second convocations of the Verkhovna Rada from May 15, 1990, to May 12, 1998.

His older brother is Mykhailo Horyn (1930-2013), also was a Ukrainian human rights activist and Soviet dissident.

== Biography ==
Bohdan Horyn was born on February 10, 1936, in the village of Kniselo in the Ukrainian SSR, now Stryi Raion, Lviv Oblast. His father Nikolai was a worker and his mother Stefania was a homeowner. Bohdan later married Oksana Ivanova, who was a doctor and pensioner.

He graduated from Ivan Franko Lviv State University, Faculty of Philology in 1959. He then became a teacher of the Ukrainian language literature, while also working at the House of Folk Creativity in Lviv. After teaching, from 1962 to 1965, he worked as a research associate at the Lviv Museum of Ukrainian Art, while simultaneously distributing samizdat materials as a member of the Sixtiers movement. In 1965, he was arrested and then sentenced in a Lviv Regional Court for "anti-Soviet activities" to three years of imprisonment, which he served at the Temlag gulag, which was located within Yavas in the Russian SFSR. While in prison, he became friends with Opanas Zalyvakha, who was a Ukrainian dissident artist.

After his release, he took on a variety of odd jobs, until 1976 when he became a senior research associate at the Lviv Art Gallery, which he served at until 1989. During this time, he became one of the founders of the Ukrainian Helsinki Union in 1988, and for the next two years headed the party's organization for Lviv Oblast. In 1990—1997 he was a member of the Ukrainian Republican Party Board and Council. He also chaired the party's organization in Lviv Oblast from 1990 to 1992. In 1997, he joined the central leadership of the Republican Christian Party, and then in 2003 the central leadership of the People's Movement of Ukraine.

In the 1990 Ukrainian parliamentary election, he became part of the Verkhovna Rada, the parliament of Ukraine. Upon joining, he became par of the "Narodna Rada" (People's Council) faction. He was again elected for the 2nd convocation in the 1994 Ukrainian parliamentary election, this time joining the electoral bloc "Derzhavnist" (Statehood).

From 1994 to 1996 he was the director of the Institute for Diaspora Studies.

In 2019 he won the Shevchenko National Prize in the category "Journalism".
