= Andrey Stavnitser =

Ukrainian businessman (born 1982)

Andriy Stavnitser
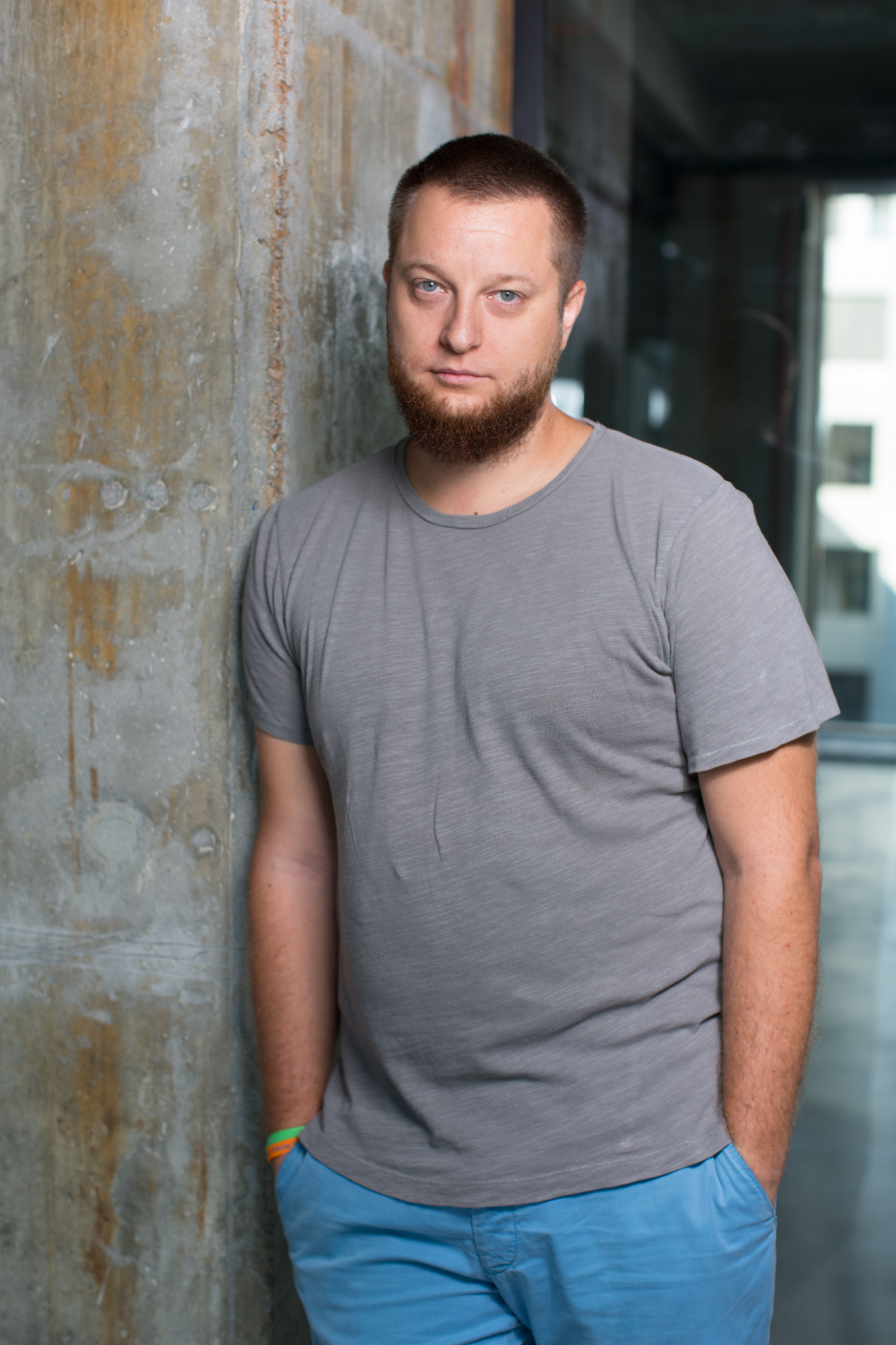
- Born: 19 June 1982 (age 44); Tyrnyauz, Kabardino-Balkarian Autonomous Soviet Socialist Republic, Russian SFSR, Soviet Union (now Kabardino-Balkaria, Russia)
- Children: 4
- Father: Oleksiy Stavnitser
- Awards: Person of the Year on Water Transport, National Maritime Rating (2014, 2016)

Andrey Alekseyevich Stavnitser (Ukrainian: Андрій Олексійович Ставніцер, romanized: Andriy Oleksiiovych Stavnitser; born 19 June 1982) is a Ukrainian businessman, co-owner and CEO of TIS. Stavnitser is also the co-owner of Neptune Grain Terminal, a P&O Maritime Ukraine towage operator and a founding partner of SD Capital Investment Company. He is honorary consul of Austria in Odesa. In 2021, Stavnitser was included in the list of the 100 richest Ukrainians by Forbes magazine, his capital amounting to US$215,000,000. Andrey is the Founder of Superhumans Center of War Trauma.

== Biography ==
Born in a family of Oleksiy Stavnitser, a famous alpinist, entrepreneur and founder of the first private port in Ukraine TransInvestService.

=== Education ===
Andrey got his high-school education in his hometown Odesa.

In 1997—1999 Stavnitser studied at Harrow House College, United Kingdom, majoring in commerce. In 1999, he graduated from the Institut Montana Zugerberg, Zug, Switzerland, majoring in International Business.

In 2001 he received an Executive MBA degree from the French Institute HCMS.

In 2012 Stavnitser graduated with distinction from Odesa National Maritime University with a degree in Corporate Management and Administration.

In 2021 Andrey completed the Executive Program at Stanford Business School.

=== Career ===
In 2001 Andrey Stavnitser started his career in family business (stevedore company Port TIS) as a Chief Dispatcher's Assistant. Over a six-year period, after having consequently held several different positions in the company, Andrey finally became the CEO of TIS in 2007. Presently, Stavnitser is one of TIS owners. The latter was established in 1994 by Andrey's father, Oleksiy Stavnitser (1942—2011).

In 2010, Andrey became the Head of International Association of Ports and Harbors from Ukraine.

In 2014 Andriy Stavnitser was granted an exequatur of the Honorary Consul of the Republic of Austria in Odesa. The consular district includes Odesa and the Odesa region.

In February 2016, Andriy Stavnitser and Martin Schuldt, general director of Cargill, sign an agreement on the construction of a new grain terminal.

In 2016, Stavnitser's company МV Cargo signed an agreement with American food company Cargill on building a 5,000,000-tonnes capacity grain terminal in cooperation with EBRD and IFC. The overall cost of the joint project investments exceeded $150 mln. The shares of Andrey Stavnitser and his brother Yegor Grebennikov in the project amount to 49%. The terminal was launched in 2018, providing Ukrainian farmers with access to the largest international market outlets. In September 2019, the terminal was opened officially and renamed to Neptune.

In 2018, Stavnitser purchased LB Shipping, a small towing company, which he later developed and sold 51% of its shares to global operator P&O Maritime. After the merger, the company changed its brand to P&O Maritime Ukraine. It is the only international towing operator in Ukraine that provides service and safety in accordance with highest international standards.

In 2020, another large M&A took place with the participation of Andrey Stavnitser, — 51% of shares of one of the TIS terminals was acquired by DP World, an international container transport operator headquartered in Dubai. The transaction, implemented by the investment company SD Capital, was recognized as the largest M&A in 2020 in Ukraine.

The TIS container terminal has been built on the initiative of Andrey Stavnitser — during his USAID internship in the 2000s, Andrey traveled a lot around American ports, and returned to Ukraine with the firm conviction that the whole world would pivot towards container transportation. The terminal survived the crisis of 2008 and significantly increased its capacity, thanks to which it attracted one of the world leaders in this industry. After the deal, the terminal changed its brand to DP World TIS Pivdennyi. Andrey Stavnitser remained a shareholder of the company.

In March 2020, at the request of the President of Ukraine Volodymyr Zelenskyy, Stavnitser headed a volunteer organization Headquarters to prevent the spread of COVID-19 in the Odesa region. Within three months of work, the Headquarters managed by Andrey Stavnitser managed to collect and send more than ₴135 million to support medical institutions in the region.

In 2021, in an interview to Forbes Ukraine magazine, Andrey Stavnitser said that after 13 years in the position of TransInvestService CEO, he decided to withdraw from operational management of his business, and remain as a shareholder while retaining his position on the TIS Supervisory Board. With this story, Andrey has been featured on the Forbes magazine cover. Andrуy Stavnitser is currently developing investment company SD Capital. The project is executed in collaboration with Philipp Grushko, who has been the Head of Business Development for TIS for many years, and later also became a member of the TIS Supervisory Board. In the short term, the company's key activities are primarily going to be aimed at Health Tech and Food Tech projects.

Andrey Stavnitser has been appointed as member of the Supervisory Board of the Aspen Institute Kyiv.

Andrey Stavnitser is also a member of the supervisory board of Jewish Confederation of Ukraine, which is a part of World Jewish Congress under the leadership of Ronald Lauder. The goal of the Jewish Confederation of Ukraine is to support Jewish communities around the country, to preserve Jewish history and culture, to revere the memory of the Jewish Holocaust as well as to stand up against antisemitism.

Stavnitser is a longtime member of the Board of Trustees of the Monster Corporation Charitable Foundation.

=== Russian invasion of Ukraine ===
During the 2022 Russian invasion of Ukraine, Stavnitser launched the humanitarian initiative www.helpukraine.center in Poland, which is now the biggest humanitarian aid hub in Eastern Europe.

On March 5, Russian forces occupied his property in Berezivka, Kyiv Oblast and used it as an artillery position. Stavnitser subsequently contacted the Ukrainian military to approve an attack on his own home so as to destroy the Russian military equipment present there.

In April 2022, Stavnitser initiated the Superhumans non-profit medical War Trauma Center. This is a state-of-art hospital, providing free of charge prosthetics, rehabilitation, reconstructive surgery and psychological support to civilians and militaries, who got war traumas.

== Recognition ==
Winner of Man of the Year in Water Transport Industry nomination according to the National Maritime Rating, 2014, two years later, in 2016, Stavnitser turned down the award.

Stavnitser has been included in the Top 5 of the most influential people in Odesa according to Novoe Vremya magazine. For his contribution to development of large-scale business, the latter has also included Stavnitser in the list of People of Modern Era – those who move the country forward, setting new standards.

Stavnitser is in the Top 100 of the richest Ukrainians according to Forbes magazine (2021) with a capital of $215 million.
