= Governor of Lviv Oblast =

Chief executive of Lviv Oblast, Ukraine

Governor of Lviv
- Seal of Lviv Oblast

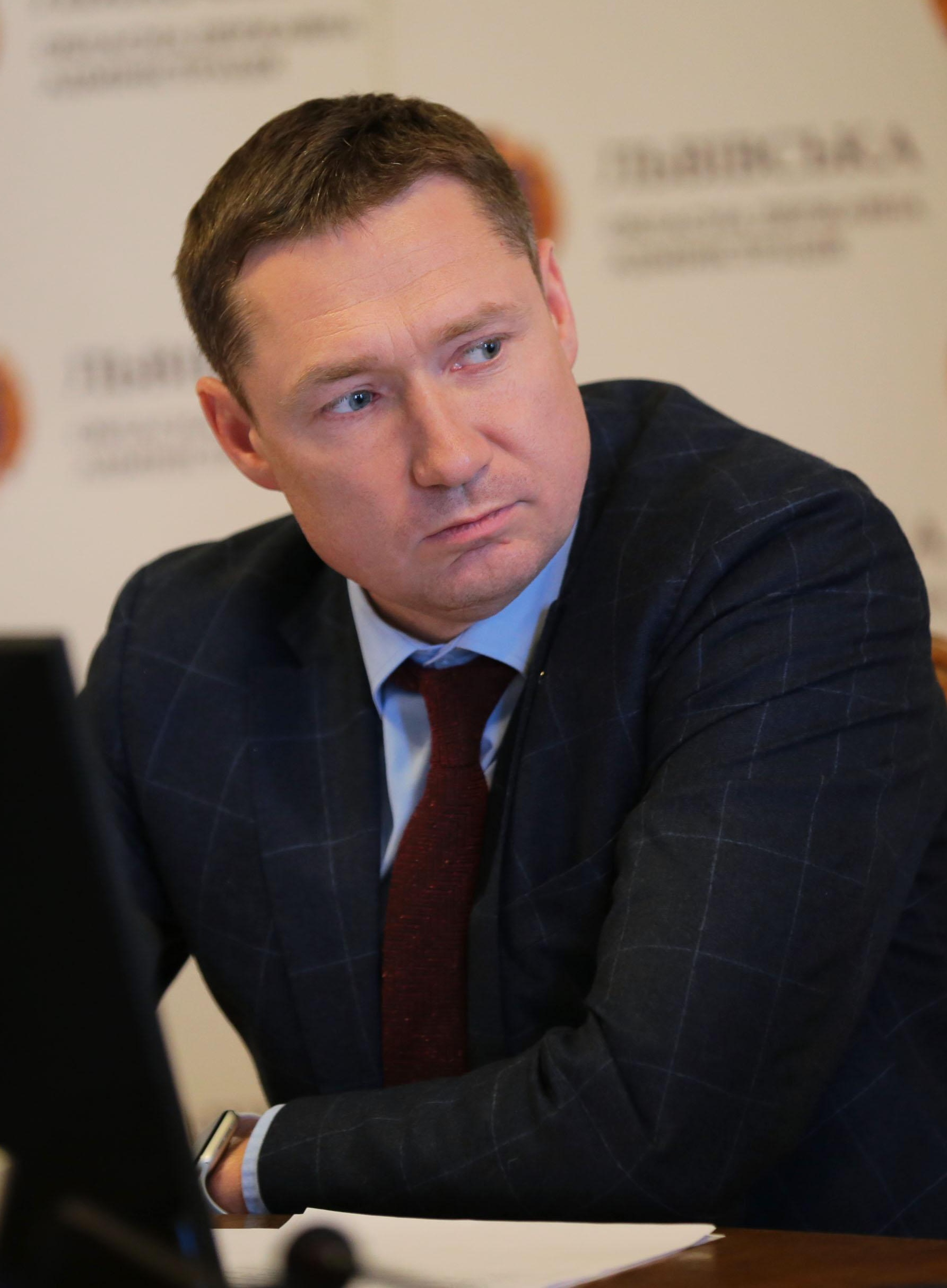
- Incumbent; Maksym Kozytskyy since 5 February 2020
- Residence: Lviv
- Inaugural holder: Stepan Davymuka
- Formation: March 20, 1992 as Presidential representative of Ukraine
- Website: Government of Lviv Oblast

The governor of Lviv Oblast is the head of executive branch for the Lviv Oblast.

The office of governor is an appointed position, with officeholders being appointed by the president of Ukraine, on recommendation from the prime minister of Ukraine.

The official residence for the governor is in Lviv. The governor is Maksym Kozytskyy, he was appointed on February 5, 2020.

== Governors ==
- 1991 – 1992 Vyacheslav Chornovil (acting; as chairman of the Council and its Executive Committee)
- 1992 – 1994 Stepan Davymuka (as Presidential representative)
- 1994 – 1997 Mykola Horyn (until 1995 acting; as chairman of the executive committee)
- 1997 – 1999 Mykhailo Hladiy
- 1999 – 2001 Stepan Senchuk
- 2001 – 2002 Mykhailo Hladiy
- 2002 – 2003 Myron Yankiv
- 2003 – 2004 Oleksandr Sendeha
- 2004 – 2005 Bohdan Matolych (acting)
- 2005 – 2008 Petro Oliynyk
- 2008 – 2008 Valeriy Pyatak (acting)
- 2008 – 2010 Mykola Kmit (acting to September 1, 2008)
- 2010 – 2010 Vasyl Horbal
- 2010 – 2011 Mykhailo Tsymbaliuk
- 2011 – 2013 Mykhailo Kostyuk
- 2013 – 2013 Viktor Shemchuk
- 2013 – 2014 Oleh Salo
- 2014 – 2014 Iryna Sekh
- 2014 – 2014 Yuriy Turyansky (acting)
- 2014 – 2019 Oleh Synyutka
- 2019 – 2019 Rostyslav Zamlynsky (acting)
- 2019 – 2019 Markiyan Malsky
- 2020 – incumbent Maksym Kozytskyy
