= List of squares in Minsk =

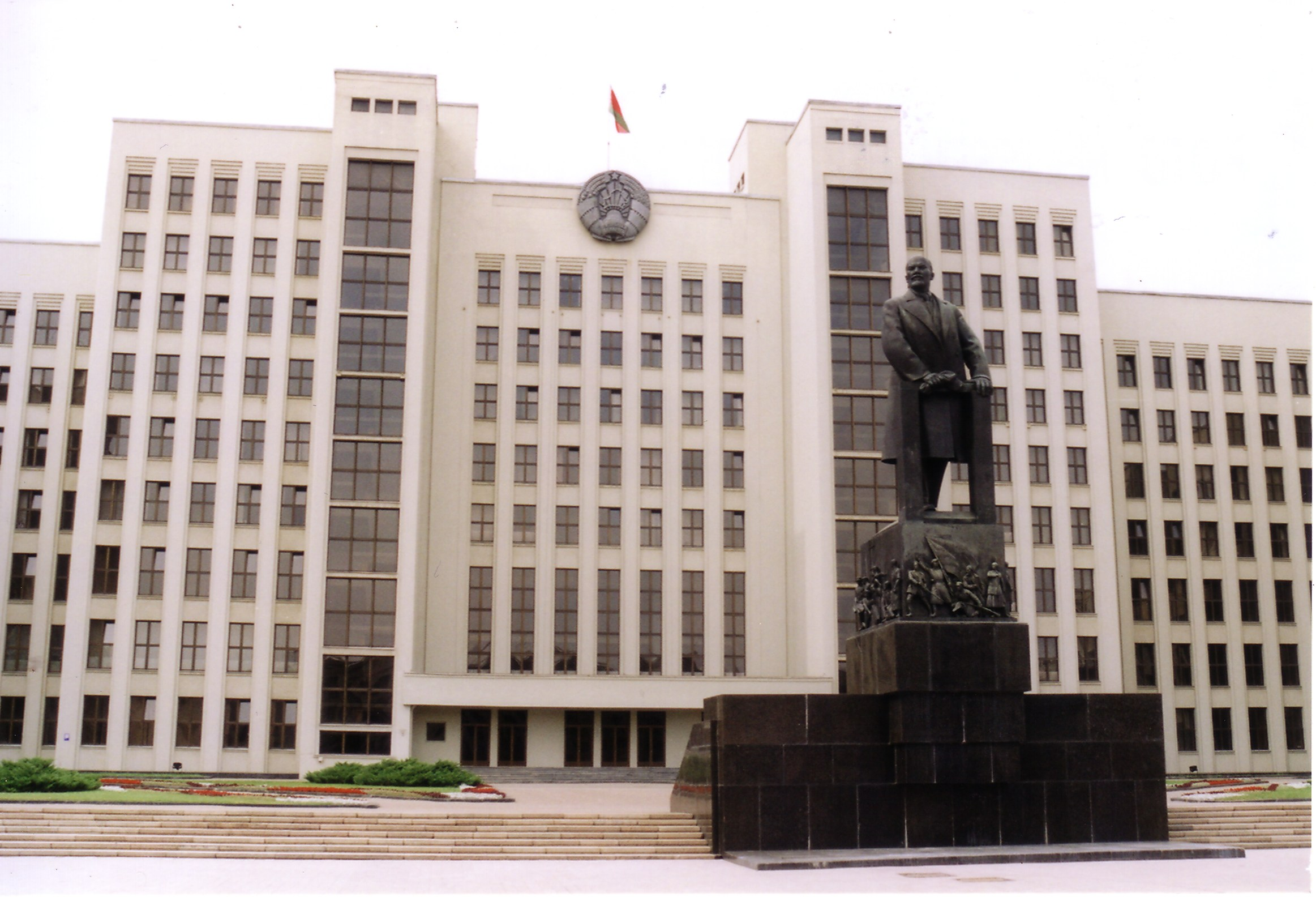
Government House and the Lenin Statue on Independence Square.

This is a list of squares in the city of Minsk, capital of Belarus.

== List of squares ==
Name	Image	District	Coordinates	Created	Streets	Landmarks
Independence Square		Maskowski	53°53′44″N 27°32′52″E	1964	Independence Avenue	Supreme Soviet; Church of Saints Simon and Helena; Belarusian State University; Minsk City Council
October Square		Tsentralny District		1961	Independence Avenue	Palace of the Republic; Museum of the Great Patriotic War; Residence of the President of Belarus
Yakub Kolas Square		Pyershamayski	53°54′56″N 27°34′57″E	1936	Independence Avenue	Monument to Yakub Kolas
Victory Square		Partyzanski	53°54′30″N 27°34′28″E	1947	Independence Avenue	Victory Monument
Kalinin Square		Pyershamayski District		1973	Independence Avenue	Monument to Mikhail Kalinin
State Flag Square		Tsentralny District		2013	Victors Avenue	National Flagpole of Belarus
Bangalore Square (Note: The square bears the name of the Indian city of Bangalore, which has been a sister city of Minsk since 1973. It was previously called Gorky Square. In turn, one of the squares in Bangalore is named after the Belarusian capital.)		Savyetski District		1973	Maxim Bogdanovich Street	Park of the Friendship of Peoples
Aliaksandraŭski Garden Square		Leninsky District		1836		
Freedom Square		Tsentralny District		1901		
Francišak Bahuševič Square		Maskowski District		1970s		
Jubilee Square		Tsentralny District		1826		
Kazintsa Square		Kastrychnitski District		1970s		
8 March Square		Tsentralny District		1931		
Myasnikov Square		Maskowski District		1914		

== See also ==
- List of cities in Belarus
