= Independence Avenue (Minsk) =

Street in Minsk, Belarus

Coordinates: 53.9167°N 27.5858°E

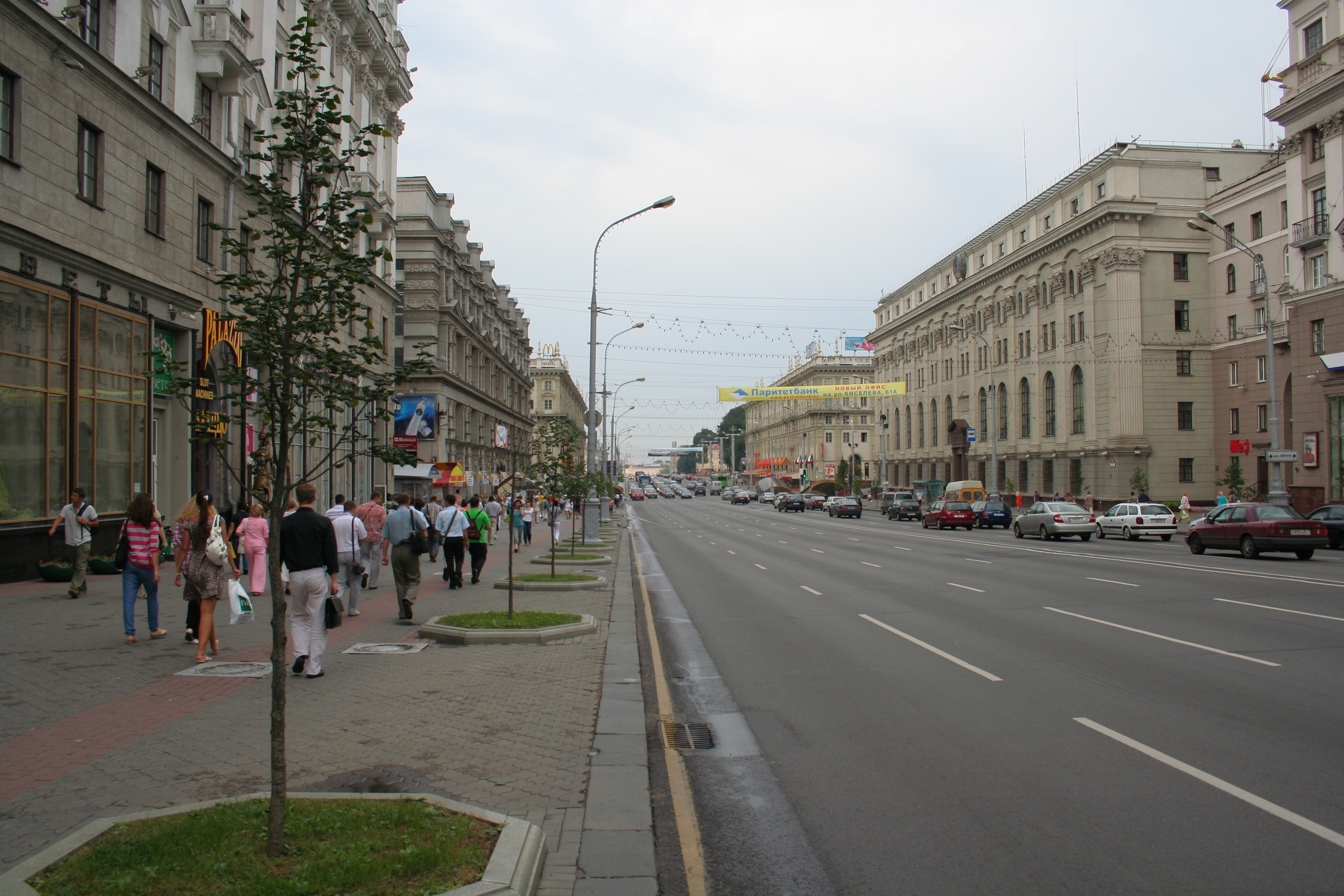
- View of the avenue

- Native name: Праспект Незалежнасці (Belarusian)
- Former names: Zahariy Street (1801-1812); New Town Street (1812); Zahar'evskaya street (1812-1918); Gaupshtrasse (1918); Soviet Street (1919); Adam Mickiewicz Street (1919-1920); Soviet Street (1920-1941); Gaupshtrasse (1941-1944); 25 of March Street (1944); Soviet Street (1944-1952); Stalin Avenue (1952-1961); Lenin Avenue (1961-1991); Francysk Skaryna Avenue (1991-2005); Independence Avenue (2005-present)
- Type: avenue
- Length: 15 km (9.3 mi)

Other
- Known for: central avenue of Minsk

Independence Avenue (Belarusian: Праспект Незалежнасці, romanized: Praspiekt Niezaliežnasci; Russian: Проспект Независимости) is the main street of Minsk, the capital of Belarus. Independence Avenue crosses Minsk radially from its centre towards the northeast. The length of the avenue is about 15 kilometres (9.3 mi).

== Notable landmarks ==
Key landmarks located from west to east:

- Independence Square
  - The House of Government
  - Minsk City Hall
  - Church of Saints Simon and Helena
  - Belarusian State University
- KGB Headquarters
- October Square
  - Palace of the Republic
  - Museum of the Great Patriotic War
  - Belarus State Circus
  - Central House of Officers
  - Trade Unions Palace of Culture
- Aleksander Garden Square
- Yanka Kupala Park
- Gorky Park
- Victory Square
- Church of Holy Trinity
- Yakub Kolas Square
- Kalinin Square
- Central Botanical Garden of the National Academy of Sciences of Belarus
- Čaliuskincaŭ Park
- National Library of Belarus.

== World Heritage status ==
Architectural ensemble of Francysk Scaryna avenue in Minsk (1940s-1950s) is on the UNESCO World Heritage Tentative List (Cultural property).

== Interesting facts ==
- Independence avenue crosses five different squares on its path: Kalinin Square, Yakub Kolas Square, Victory Square, October Square and Independence Square.
- The avenue's name was changed 14 times.
