= Aliaksandraŭski Garden Square =

City square in Minsk, Belarus

Coordinates: 53°54′05″N 27°33′47″E

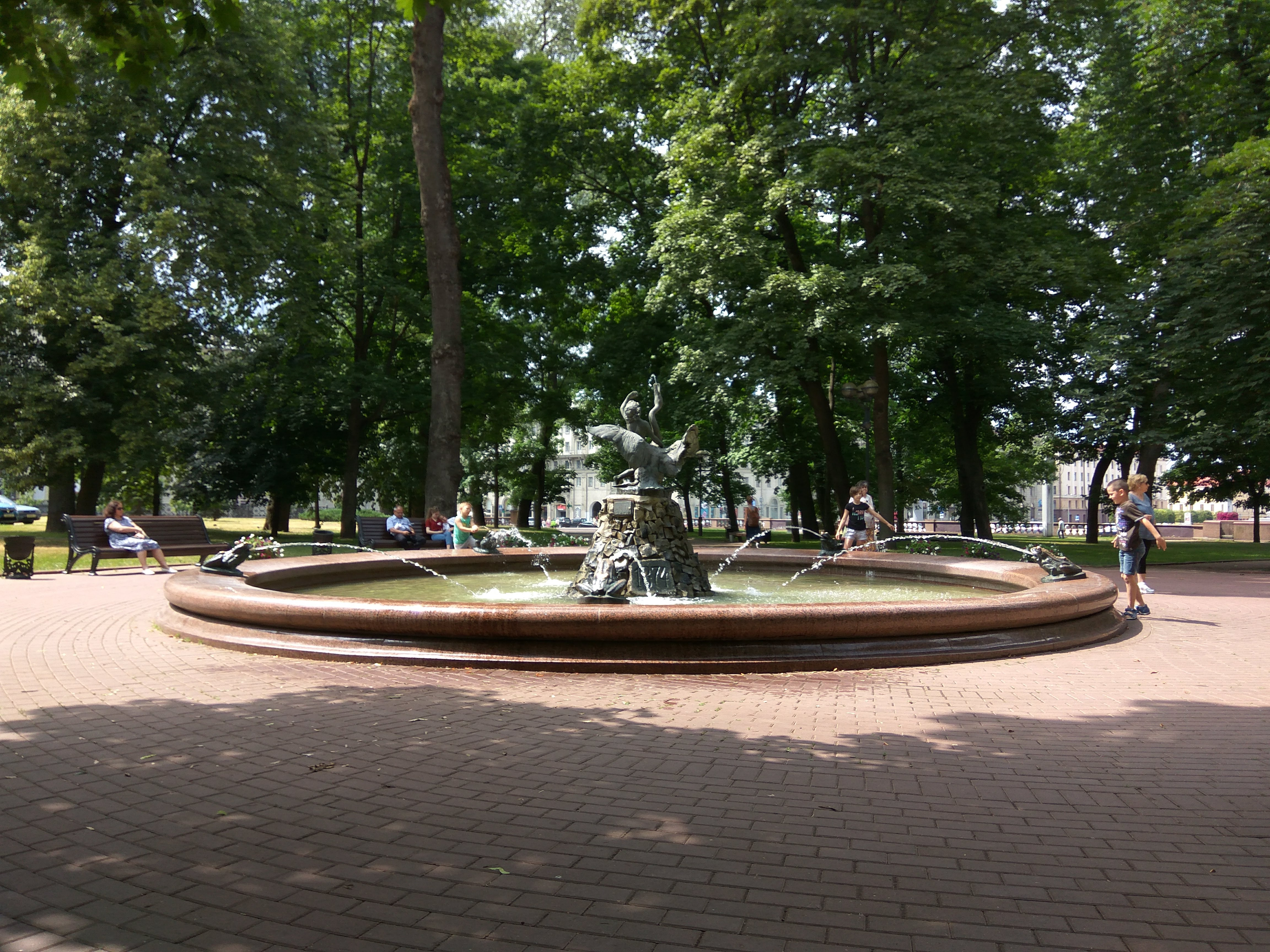
Central fountain plaza of Aliaksandraŭski Garden Square

Aliaksandraŭski Garden Square is a square located in the center of Minsk, Belarus. Janka Kupala National Theatre is situated on the square, while Kupalaŭskaja and Kastryčnickaja metro stations' entrances overlook the square. Surrounded by Independence Avenue, Karl Marx Street, Red Army Soldiers Street, and Engels Street, the square overlooks October Square, the Residence of the President of Belarus and the Central House of Officers.

One of the most famous fountains in Minsk, named Boy with a Swan, is located in the centre of the square.
