= Victory Square, Minsk =

City square in Minsk, Belarus

Coordinates: 53°54′30″N 27°34′28″E

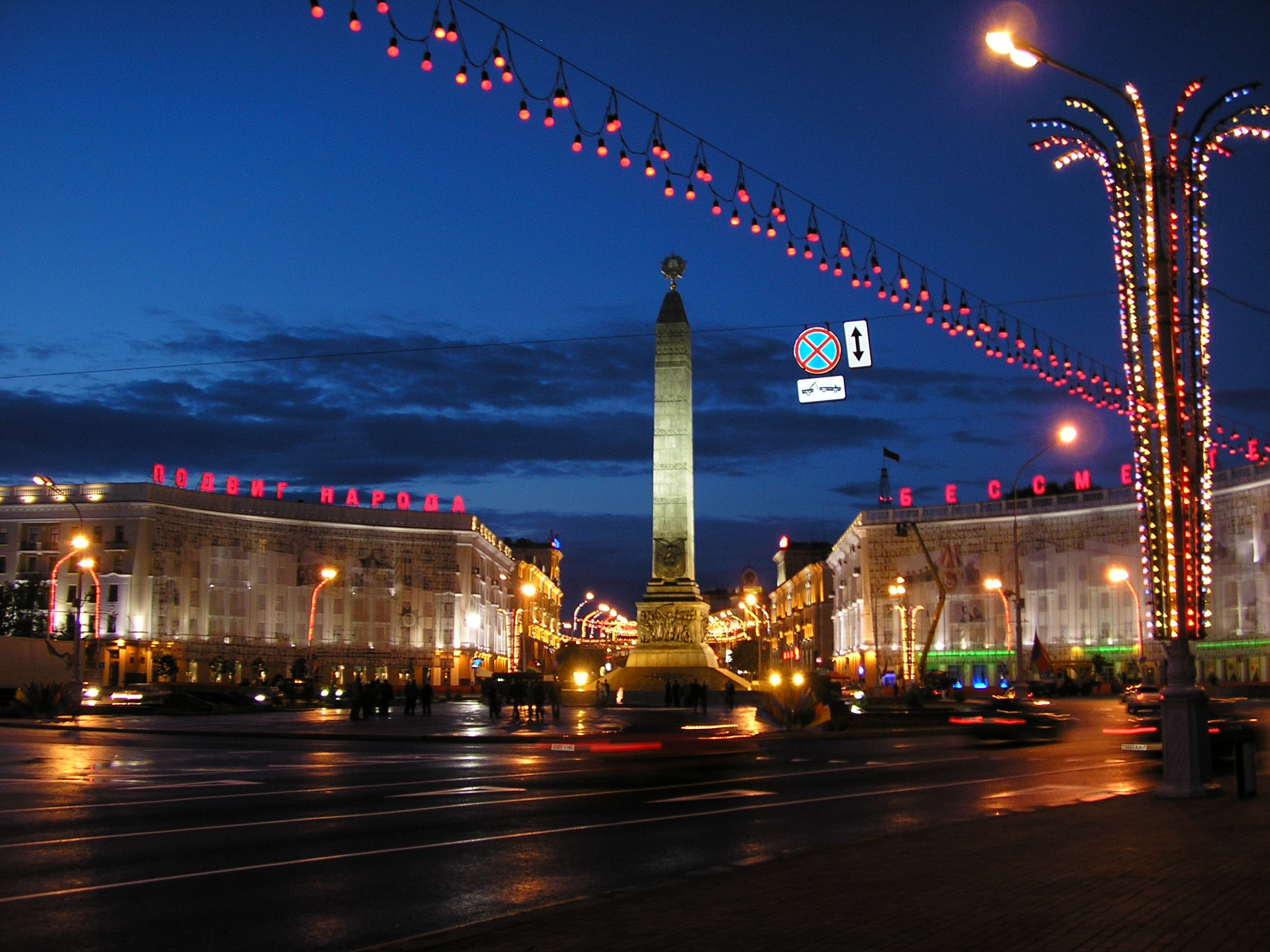
Victory Square

Victory Square (Belarusian: Пло́шча Перамо́гі, romanized: Plóšča Pieramóhi; Russian: Пло́щадь Побе́ды) is a square in Minsk, Belarus, located at the intersection of Independence Avenue and Zakharau Street. The square is located in the historic centre of Minsk with the Museum of the 1st Congress of RSDLP, the main offices of National State TV and Radio and the City House of Marriages nearby. A green park stretches from Victory Square to the Svislach River and to the entrance to Gorky Park. Holiday parades typically go through Victory Square, while newlyweds traditionally take their picture at the square.

== Victory Monument ==
A 3-metre (9.8 ft) replica of the Order of Victory crowns a granite column of 38 metres (125 ft) erected in the centre of the square. The Sacred Sword of Victory is at the base of the monument. The monument was built in 1954 in honour of the soldiers of the Soviet Army and the partisans of Belarus. Sculptors: Z. Azgur, A. Bembel, S. Selikhanau. Architects: U. Karol, G. Zagorski.

The four facets of the pedestal hold bronze relief thematic images: "May 9, 1945", "Soviet Army during the Great Patriotic War", "Belarusian Partisans", "Honour to Heroes who gave their lives for liberation".

The four bronze wreaths around the obelisk signify the four Fronts. The soldiers of these fronts gave their lives fighting to liberate Belarus from German Fascist invaders.

=== Post #1 ===
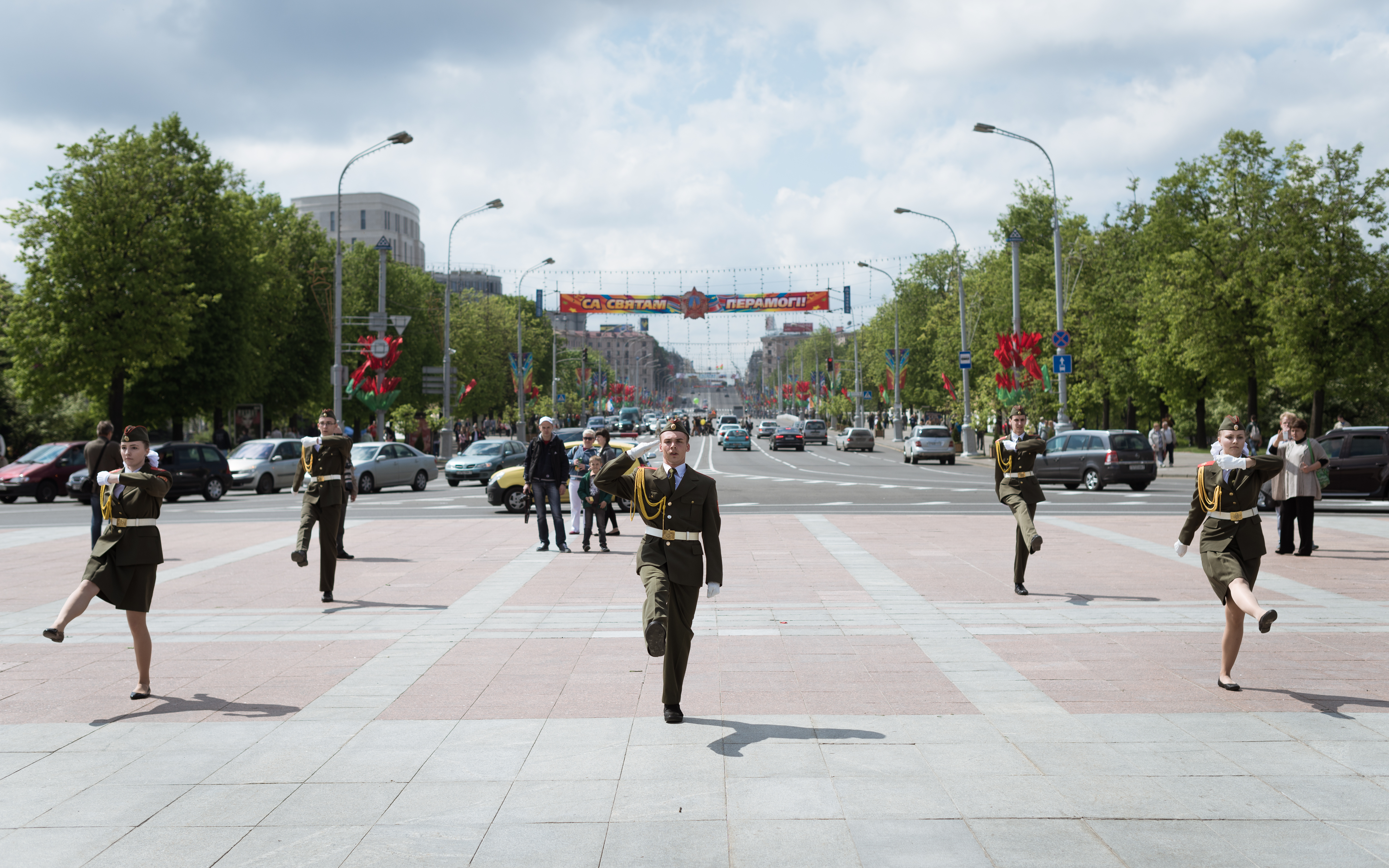
Cadets of the Military Academy of Belarus during a guard mounting ceremony.

Post #1 at Victory Square refers to guard duty that is carried out by members of the armed forces and among students of general education schools and vocational schools in Minsk. Post #1 was initiated on 3 July 1984, on the occasion of the 40th anniversary of the liberation of Minsk. The guard of honor serves at Post No. 1 for one week from 9.00 to 17.00 in the cold and from 9.00 to 18.00 in the warm time of the day. The duration of each shift is 10 to 20 minutes. The only breaks in maintaining the honorary were from 15 May to 1 November 1988, from 1 June to 20 November 2003, and from 1 December 2003 to 20 April 2004.

== History of Construction ==
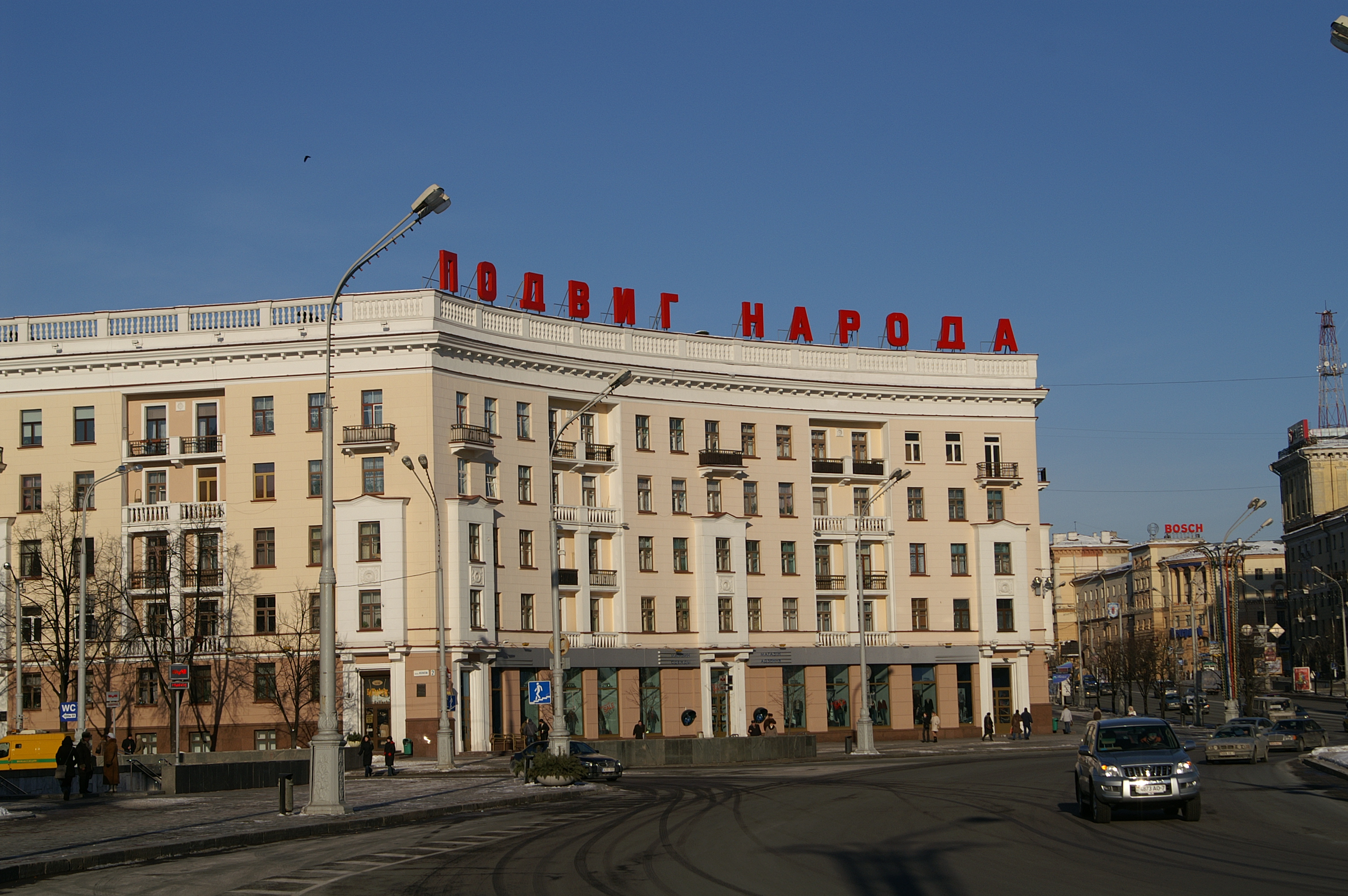
Buildings around the Victory Square. The red letters on the buildings read "Heroic deed of the people is immortal".

Prior to 1958 the square held a name "Kruglaya" (Round). Builders led by architect R. Stoler started constructing two round buildings around the square. During the Great Patriotic War the buildings were partially destroyed. R. Stoler returned to Minsk in 1957 to help rebuild these buildings. Before the Great Patriotic War a street car was running on Sovetskaya street through the square. Before the construction of the Victory Monument there was a memorial stone fenced with a chain.

In 1946 the BSSR government opened a competition for the design of a Victory Memorial. Initially the site was planned in the vicinity of the current "Kastrychnitskaya" (October) square. Selected design provided for a 48-metre (157 ft) monument made of white pink marble. To open the memorial by the 10th anniversary of liberation of Belarus, the design was adjusted to use gray granite and make the column 10 metres (33 ft) shorter. Ukrainian quarries near Dnepropetrovsk and Zhytomyr provided the granite for construction. The Leningrad Academy of Arts crafted the mosaic for the Order of Victory. Ukrainian carvers indented the granite reliefs. Leningrad factory "Monumentskulptura" cast bronze reliefs, sword and wreaths. On 3 July 1961, on the 17th anniversary of liberation of Minsk, Honourable Citizen of Minsk, Hero of Soviet Union colonel-general Alexei Burdeinei lit the eternal flame at the foundation of the obelisk. In 1984, architects B. Larchenko, B. Shkolnikov, and K.Vyazgin re-designed the square from round into oval to fit the exits from metro station. On 1 July 1984 granite blocks were mounted with capsules containing soil from several Soviet hero cities: Moscow, Saint Petersburg, Volgograd, Kiev, Odessa, Sevastopol, Kerch, Novorossiysk, Tula, Brest Fortress. In 1985 capsules with soil from Hero Cities Smolensk and Murmansk were added.

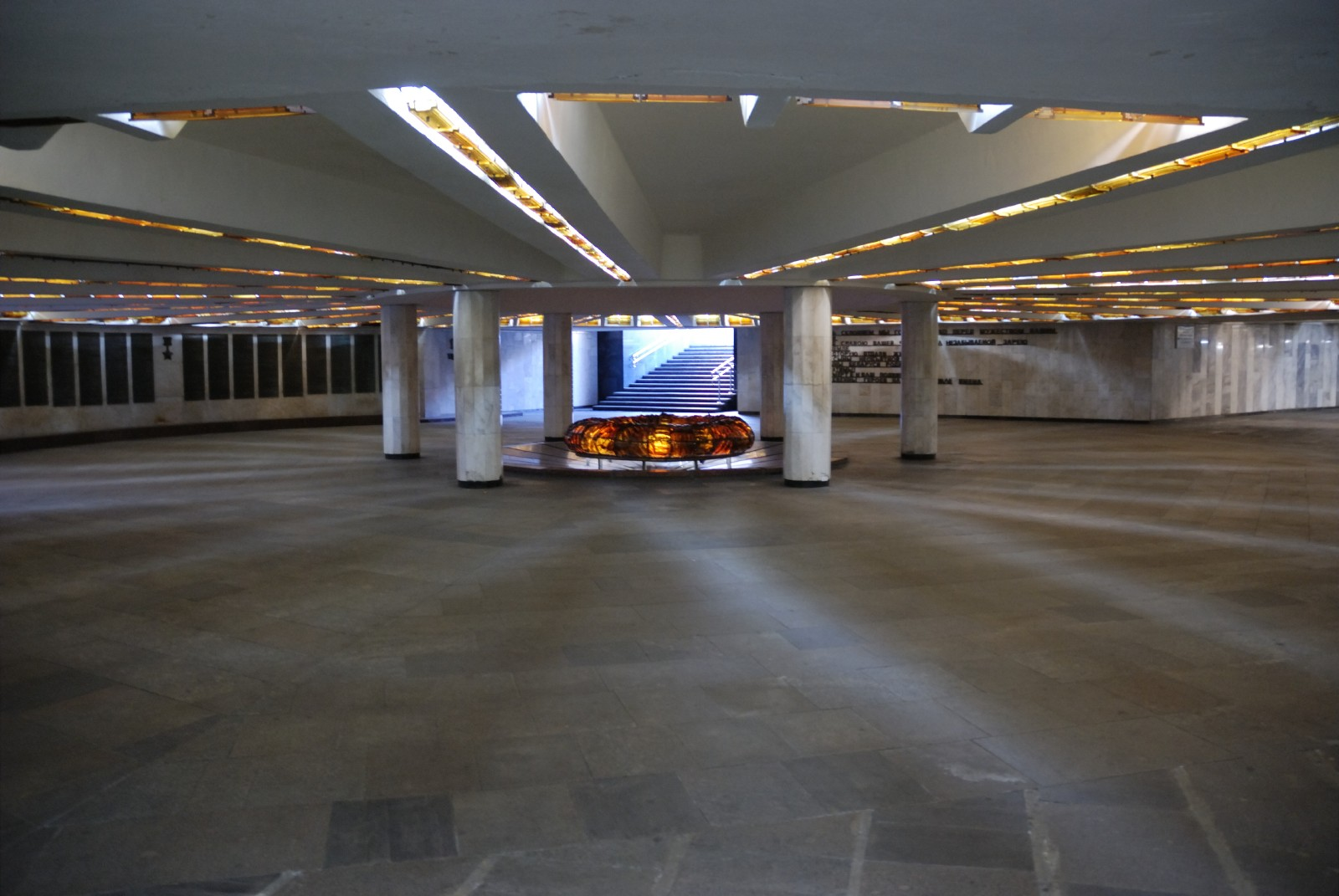
Memorial Hall in the pedestrian underpass

On 8 May 1985, in commemoration of the 40th anniversary of Victory in Great Patriotic War, a Memorial Hall opened in the pedestrian underpass under the Victory Square. The Hall honours the Heroes of Soviet Union who gave their lives to liberate Belarus from Nazi occupation. A circular gallery under the square connects the underpass with the Memorial Hall. Artist V. Pozhyak crafted a highlighted glass wreath in the center of the Hall. A bronze star, of Hero of Soviet Union, is embedded in the hall's wall. 566 names of natives from Belarus and other Soviet republics are also listed on the wall, of those who fought to liberate Belarusian soil and were awarded the title of Hero of Soviet Union for their heroic deeds.

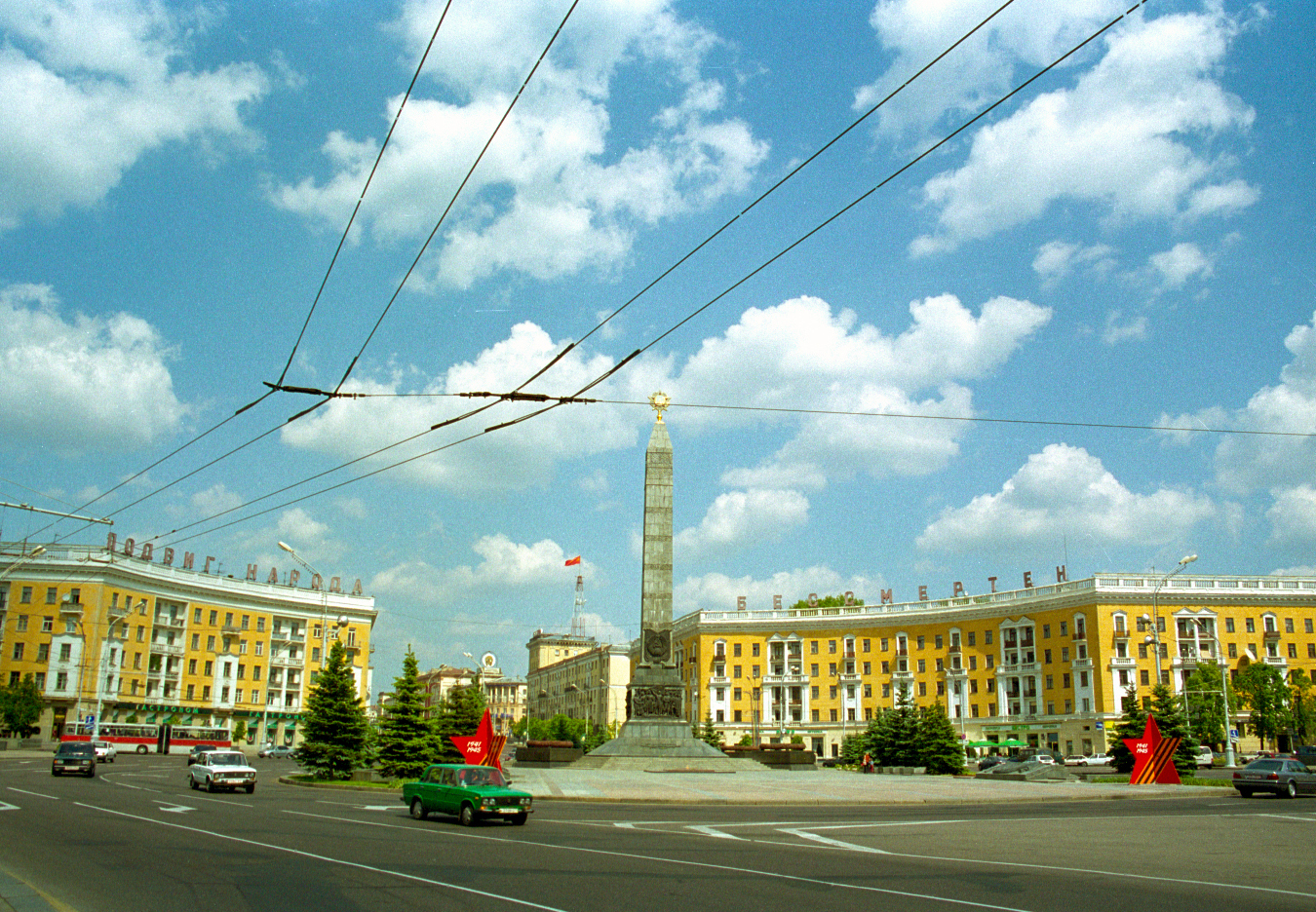
The square before restoration in 2003

In 2003, the square was slightly updated to improve the monument's stability due to damage from metro trains running under it, as well as to replace the grown-up firs with grass lawns.
