= Kalinin Square, Minsk =

City square in Minsk, Belarus

Coordinates: 53.9235°N 27.6079°E

Monument to Mikhail Kalinin
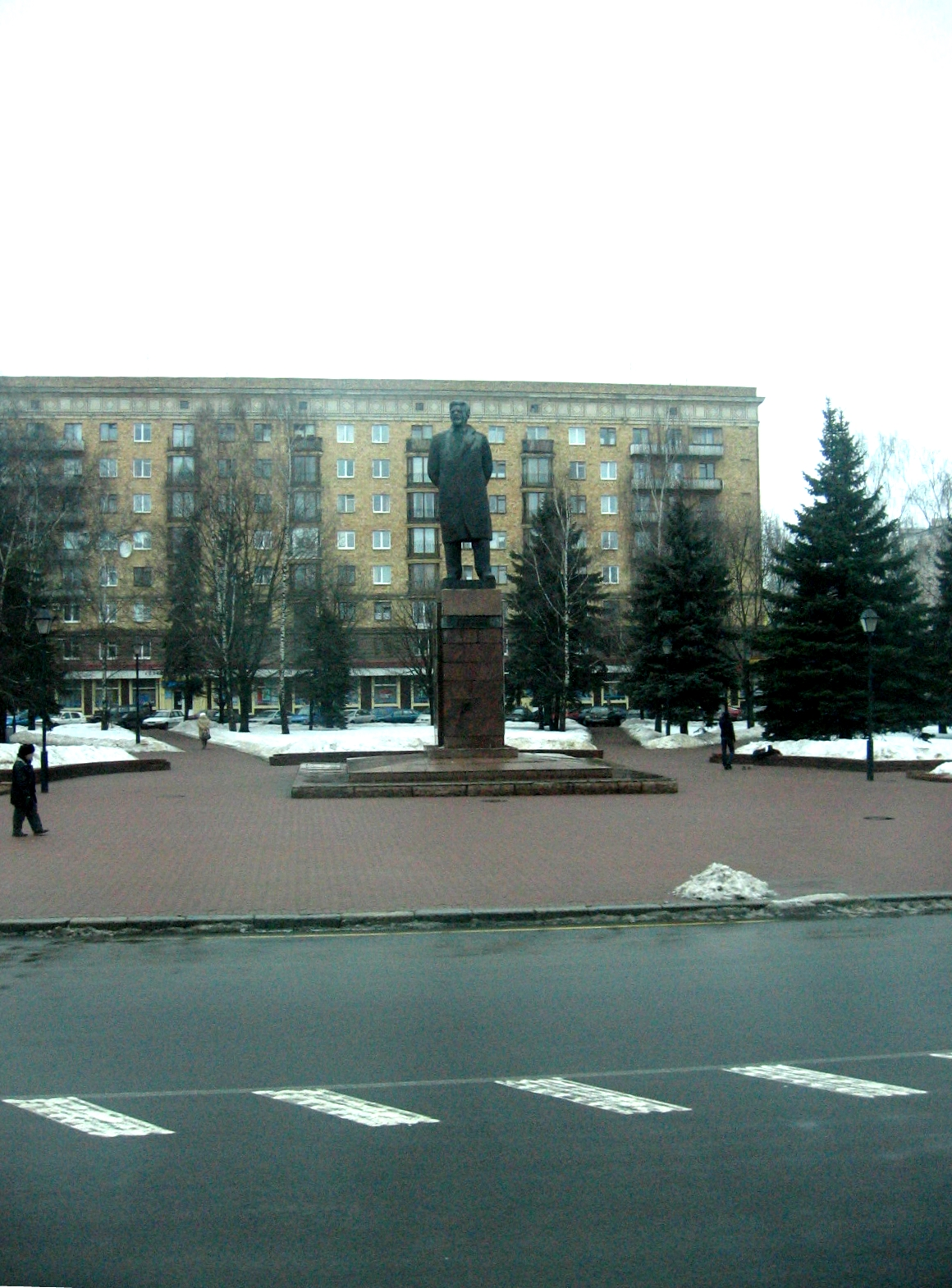
- Interactive map of Monument to Mikhail Kalinin
- Material: Bronze
- Height: ~5.5 m
- Opening date: 1978
- Dedicated to: Mikhail Kalinin

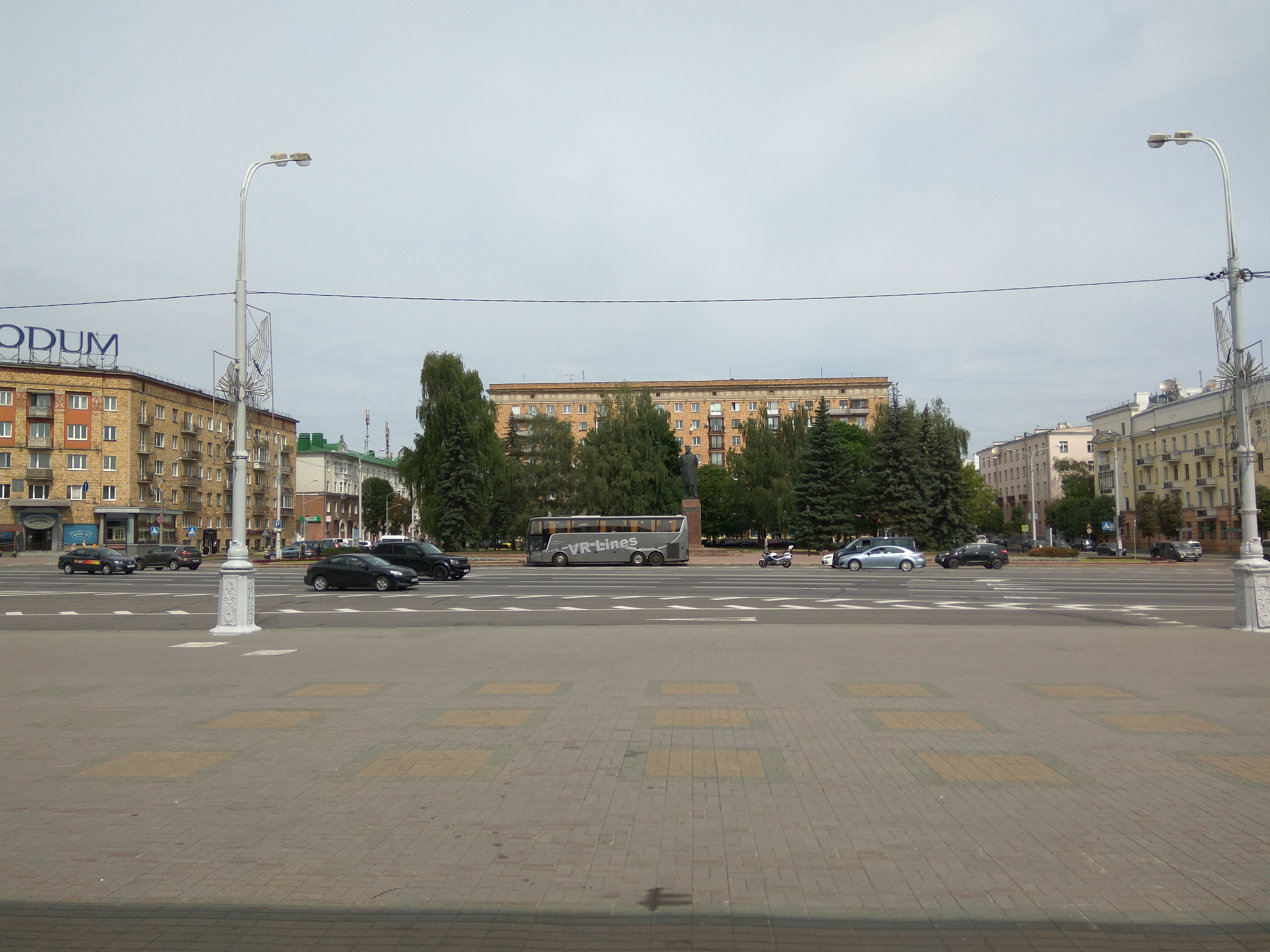
Kalinin Square in 2018

Kalinin Square (Belarusian: Плошча Калініна) is the 5th square on the Independence Avenue of Minsk. The square was named in honor of the Soviet Head of State Mikhail Kalinin. The square started to form in 1953. The monument to Kalinin, located on the square, was built in 1978.

== Criticism of the name ==
An official letter concerning the need for destruction of the monument to Mikhail Kalinin and removing his name from the city's toponymy was sent to the Minsk Executive Committee by Belarusian activists in 2010. This was attributed to the fact that Mikhail Kalinin was one of six members of the Soviet Politburo who signed an order to execute 25,700 Polish "nationalists and counterrevolutionaries" kept at camps and prisons in western Ukraine and Belarus, on 5 March 1940, during the Katyn Massacre.

== See also ==
- List of squares in Minsk
