= Yakub Kolas Square =

City square in Minsk, Belarus

Coordinates: 53°54′56″N 27°34′57″E

The Yakub Kolas Square (Belarusian: Плошча Якуба Коласа - Plošča Jakuba Kolasa) is a square in Pershamayski District of Minsk, located on the crossing of Independence Avenue, Yakub Kolas street and Vera Khoruzhaya street. The square was named in honour of the folk poet and one of the founders of the classic Belarusian literature - Yakub Kolas.

== Description ==
=== History ===
Yakub Kolas square is located at the place of the historical village Kamarouka, which in turn gave name to the nearby Kamarou Flee Market. Initially the square bore the name "Kamarouskaya". In 1956 the square was named in honour of the folk poet and one of the founders of the classic Belarusian literature - Yakub Kolas. The monument to Yakub Kolas was opened November 3, 1972 celebrating the 90th anniversary of the birth of Yakub Kolas.

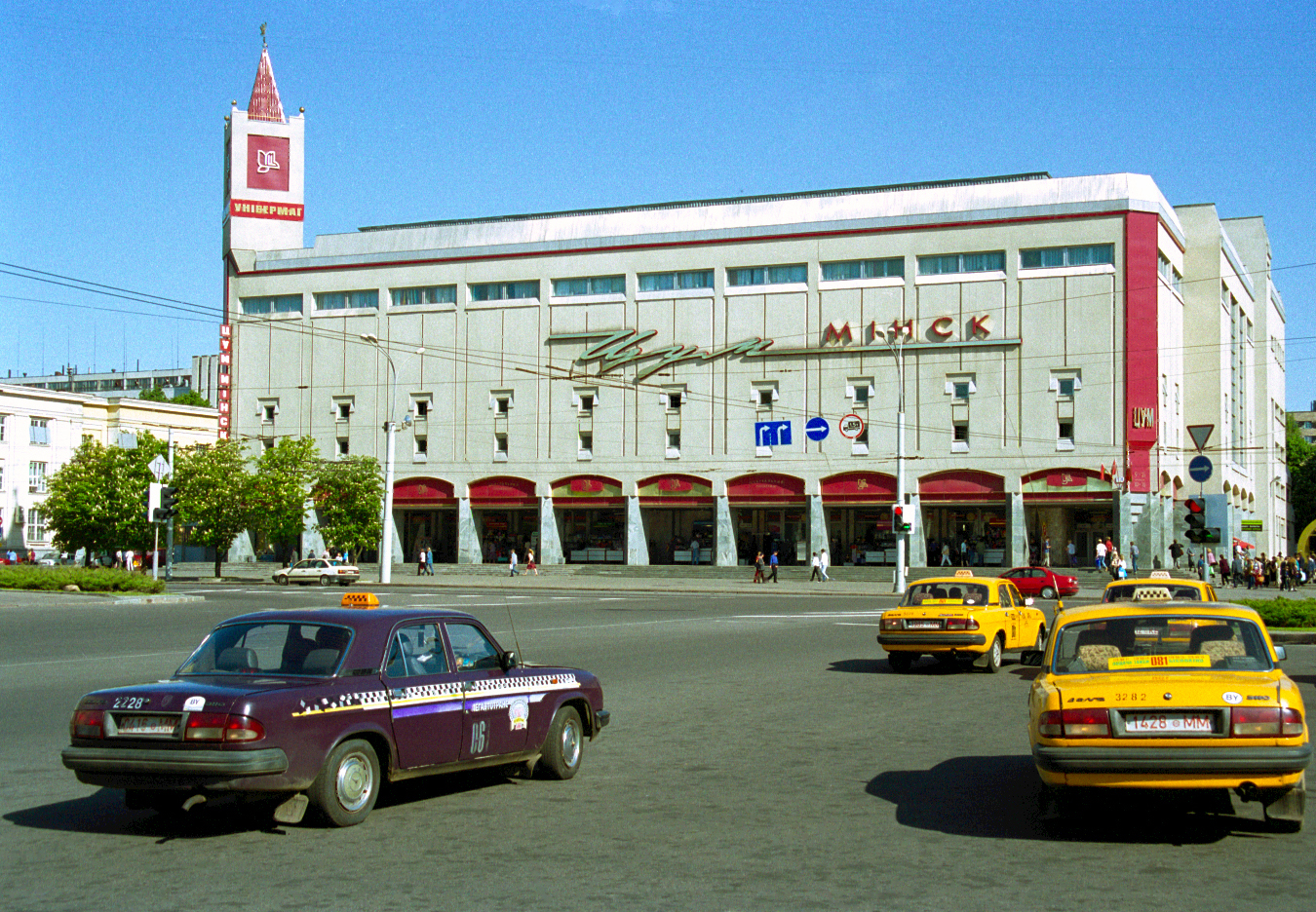
Minsk Central Department Store - "TSUM"

=== Architectural ensemble ===
The sculptures of Yakub Kolas and figures from his poems form the architectural centerpiece of the square. Lush greenery and fountains make this square an attractive landmark on a hot summer day for nearby workers, shoppers and city tourists. City underground station of the Moskovskaya line exits to the square, nearby tram stop, bus and trolley stop. Clay tiles in national style lay the vestibule of the station.

Several central streets join at the square including Yakub Kolas Street, Parade (Krasnaya) street, Golden Hill (Zalataya Horka), Very Choruzhey Street and Moulyavin Boulevard. Belarus Olympic Committee faces the square from the east.

Minsk Production Amalgamation for Computers and Minsk Print Works face the square from the North. The towers of both buildings form a "gate" together with Very Choruzhey street similar in style to the Stalinist towers on Station Square facing Minsk Railway Station. Restaurant "At Crossroads" with its characteristic red face brick overlooks the square from the West. The National Philharmonic is located to the south of the square and surrounded with dwellings, department store "TSUM" and supermarket "Stolichny". The architects succeeded to make it a convenient City center for residents, workers, shoppers, tourists and art lovers.
