= Yakub Kolas =

Belarusian writer

Yakub Kolas Якуб Колас
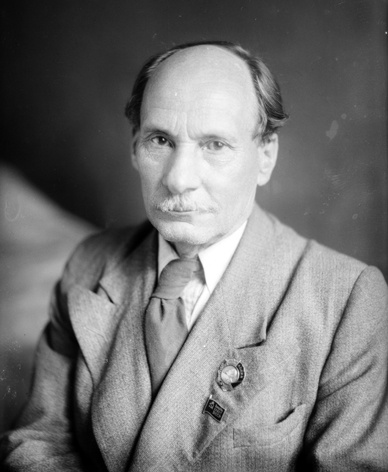
- Born: Kanstantsin Mihaylavich Mitskievich; 3 November [O.S. 22 October] 1882; Akinchytsy, Minsk Governorate, Russian Empire
- Died: 13 August 1956 (aged 73); Minsk, Byelorussian SSR, Soviet Union
- Occupations: Writer, dramatist, poet, translator
- Writing career
- Period: 1906–1956

Yakub Kolas (also Jakub Kołas, Belarusian: Яку́б Ко́лас, 3 November [O.S. 22 October] 1882 – 13 August 1956), real name Kanstantsin Mikhailavich Mitskievich (Канстанці́н Міха́йлавіч Міцке́віч, Russian: Константи́н Миха́йлович Мицке́вич, Polish: Konstanty Mickiewicz) was a Belarusian writer, dramatist, poet and translator. People's Poet of the Byelorussian SSR (1926), member (1928) and vice-president (from 1929) of the Belarusian Academy of Sciences.

In his works, Yakub Kolas was known for his sympathy towards the ordinary Belarusian peasantry. This was evident in his pen name 'Kolas', meaning 'ear of grain' in Belarusian. He wrote collections of poems Songs of Captivity (Russian: Песни неволи, 1908) and Songs of Grief (Belarusian: Песьні-жальбы, 1910), poems A New Land (Belarusian: Новая зямля, 1923) and Simon the Musician (Belarusian: Сымон-музыка, 1925), stories, and plays. His poem The Fisherman's Hut (Belarusian: Рыбакова хата, 1947) is about the fight after unification of Belarus with the Soviet state. His trilogy At a Crossroads (Russian: На перепутье, 1925) is about the pre-Revolutionary life of the Belarusian peasantry and the democratic intelligentsia. He was awarded the Stalin Prize in 1946 and 1949.

== Biography ==
Kanstantsin Mitskievich was born in 3 November [O.S. 22 October] 1882 in a village Akinchytsy of Minsk Governorate, Russian Empire, in a family of a forester. He graduated from Nesvizh Teachers' Seminary in 1902, and was sent as a teacher to a village in Palesse region. He took part in an illegal teachers convention in 1906, was fired and jailed for three years in Minsk. After jail he became a journalist for Nasha dolya newspaper, there he first used the name "Yakub Kolas". In 1915 he was mobilized into the army. In 1916, after graduating from the Moscow Alexander Military School with the rank of warrant officer, he served in a reserve regiment in Perm. In the summer of 1917 he was sent to the Romanian front, but for health reasons he was demobilized. In 1921 Kolas returned to Minsk to work in the newly established Institute of Belarusian Culture. In 1928 Institute was transformed into the Academy of Sciences, Kolas became an academician there, and later a vice president. In 1926 he was named a "People's Poet of Belarus". During the World War 2 Kolas was in evacuation in Russia. He died in Minsk, on 13 August 1956.

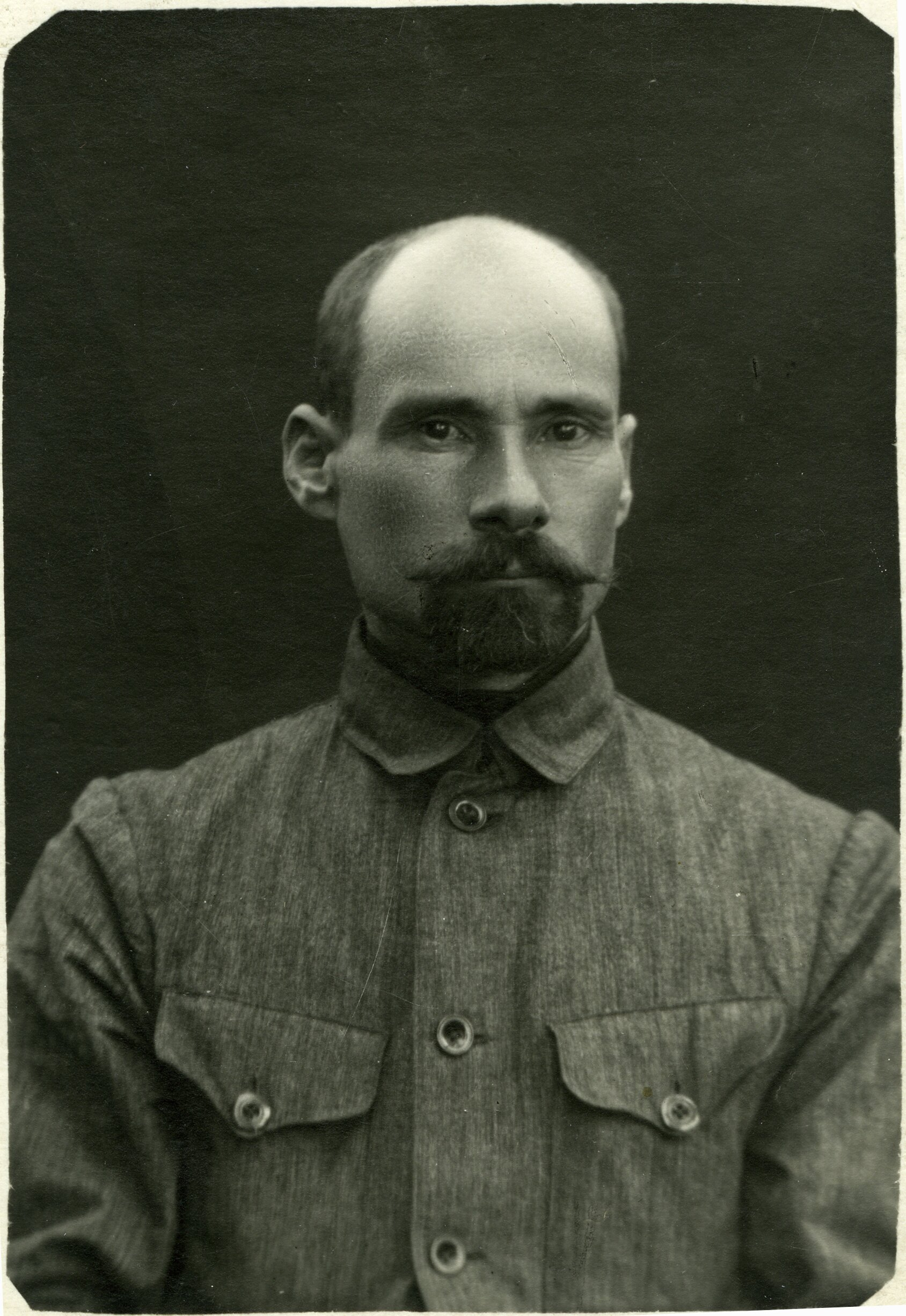
Kolas in 1921

In his honor, the Yakub Kolas Square and the Yakub Kolas Street in the center of Minsk bear his name.

== Bibliography ==
=== Biographies ===
- Вялікі пясняр беларускага народа. Зборнік артыкулаў аб жыцці і дзейнасці Якуба Коласа. Мінск, 1959.
- З жыццяпісу Якуба Коласа: Дакументы і матэрыялы / Уклад., уступ. артыкул і імян. паказ. Г. В. Кісялёва; Рэд. В. В. Барысенка, М. І. Мушынскі. Мінск, 1982.
- Казбярук У. М. Колас Якуб // Беларуская энцыклапедыя. У 18 т. Т. 8. Мінск, 1999. С. 382—384.
- Лужанін М. Колас расказвае пра сябе. Мінск, 1982.
- Мацюх М. Д., Мушынскі М. І. Колас Якуб // Беларускія пісьменнікі: Біябібліягр. слоўн. У 6 т. Т. 3 / Ін-т літ. імя Я. Купалы АН Рэспублікі Беларусь, Беларус. Энцыкл.; Пад рэд. А. В. Мальдзіса. Мінск, 1994. С. 299—304.
- Мушынскі М. І. Коласазнаўства // Беларуская энцыклапедыя. У 18 т. Т. 8. Мінск:, 1999. С. 386—387.
- Мушынскі М. І. Якуб Колас: Летапіс жыцця і творчасці. Мінск, 1982.
- Мушынскі М. І. Летапіс жыцця і творчасці Якуба Коласа. — Мінск: Беларуская навука, 2012. — 1127 с. — ISBN 978-985-08-1460-9.
- Навуменка І. Я. Якуб Колас: Нарыс жыцця і творчасці. Мінск, 1982.
- Разам з народам. Матэрыялы юбілейнай навуковай сесіі АН БССР, прысвечанай 100-годдзю з дня нараджэння Янкі Купалы і Якуба Коласа / Пад рэд. І. Я. Навуменкі. Мінск, 1983.
- Тычына М. Колас Якуб // Энцыклапедыя гісторыі Беларусі. У 6 т. Т. 4. Мінск, 1997. С. 225—227.
- Якуб Колас: Да 100-годдзя з дня нараджэння. Біябібліягр. паказ. / Склад. Н. Б. Ватацы, М. І. Пратасевіч, Н. А. Адамовіч, А. Б. Дунаеўская; Рэд. В. П. Рагойша. Мінск, 1983.
- Янка Купала і Якуб Колас у кантэксце славянскіх літаратур. — Мн., 2002.
