= Independence Square, Minsk =

Square in Minsk, Belarus

Coordinates: 53.8956°N 27.5478°E

Independence Square
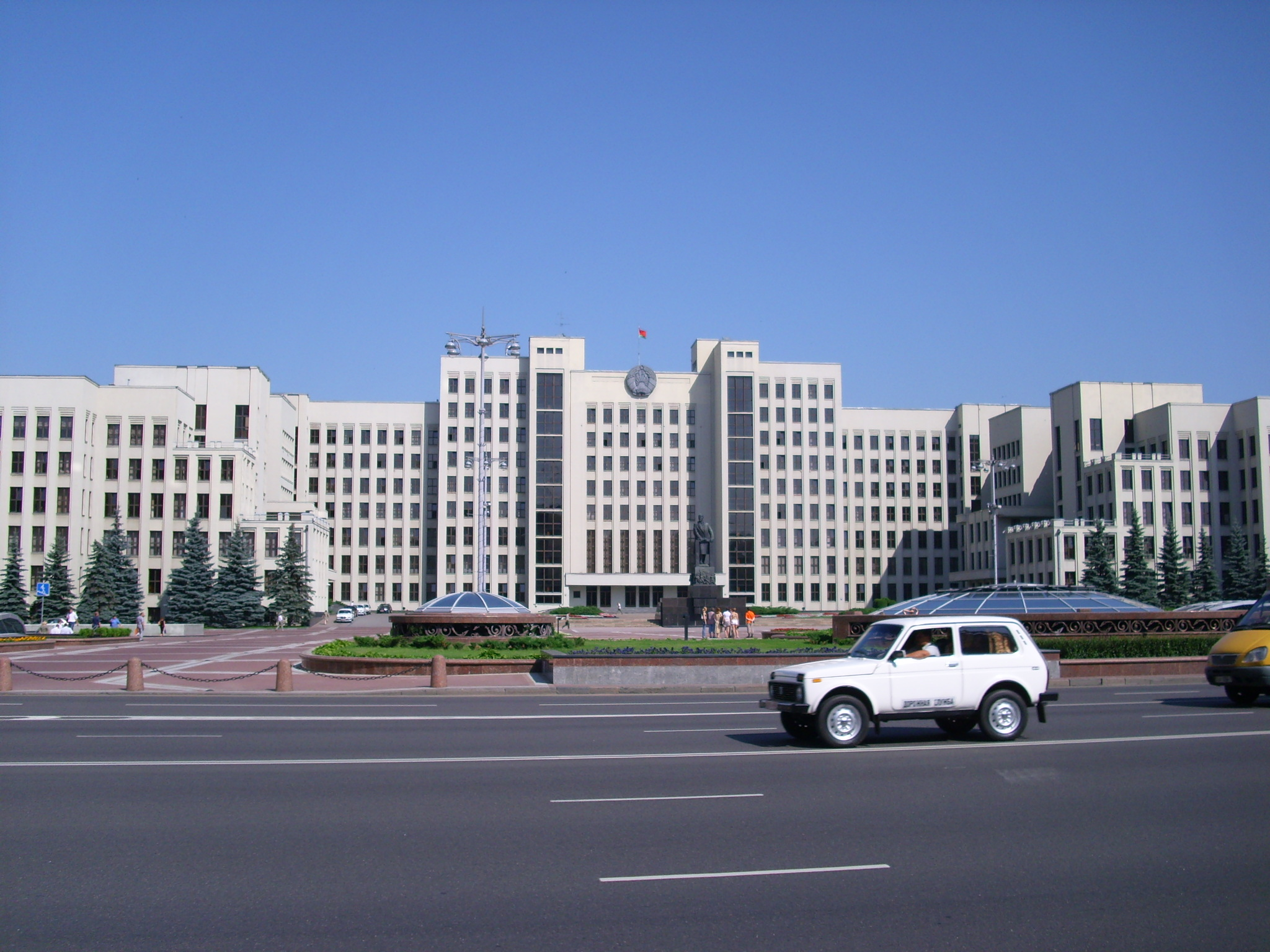
- Independence Square

- Native name: Плошча Незалежнасці (Belarusian) Площадь Независимости (Russian)
- Former name: Lenin Square
- Type: Square
- Maintained by: Minsk Mayor’s Office
- Area: 7 hectares (17 acres)
- Location: Independence Avenue, Maskowski District, Minsk
- Nearest metro station: Minsk Metro

Construction
- Construction start: 1964
- Completion: 2002

Other
- Designer: Iosif Langbard
- Known for: Multiple ceremonial events and hosting the seat of government.

Independence Square (Belarusian: Плошча Незалежнасці, Belarusian pronunciation: [ˈpɫoʂt͡ʂa nʲezaˈlʲeʐnasʲt͡sʲi], Russian: Площадь Независимости, romanized: Ploshchad Nezavisimosti) is a square in Minsk, Belarus. It is one of the landmarks on Independence Avenue. The National Assembly of Belarus and Minsk City Hall are on this square. During the period of the Byelorussian Soviet Socialist Republic it was called Lenin Square. It is currently one of the largest squares in Europe. The Minsk Metro's Ploshcha Lyenina station opens to the square, and the area is also serviced by the 1, 69, and 119с busses, among several others.

== History ==
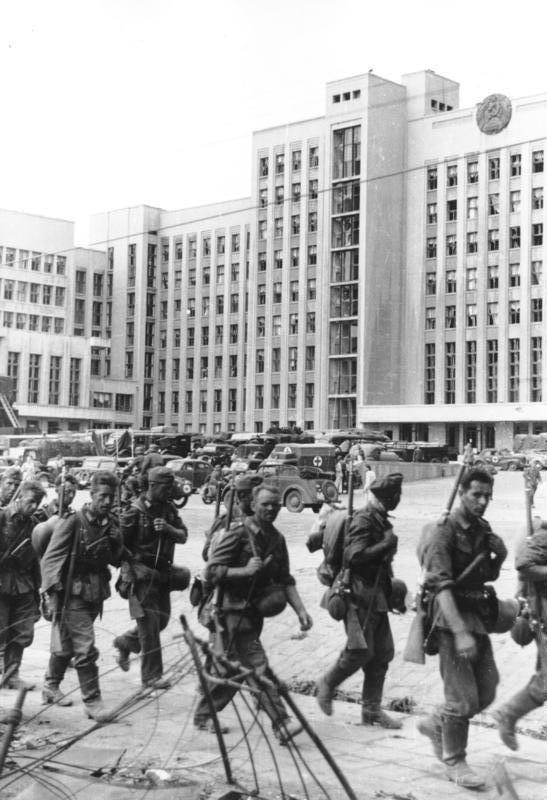
Wehrmacht troops marching through Independence Square 1941.

The square was designed by Iosif Langbard and was created for conducting rallies and to serve as Minsk's main ceremonial venue during the Soviet times. During World War II most buildings that were on the square were destroyed by the Nazis. From 1946 to 1984 October Square replaced Lenin Square as the city's main venue. A project for the reconstruction of Independence Square was launched after the fall of the USSR. The first stage was completed in 2002. The transportation scheme of the area was then changed. Two more pedestrian underpasses as well as the underground shopping mall "Stolica" were constructed.

== Events ==
=== Parades ===
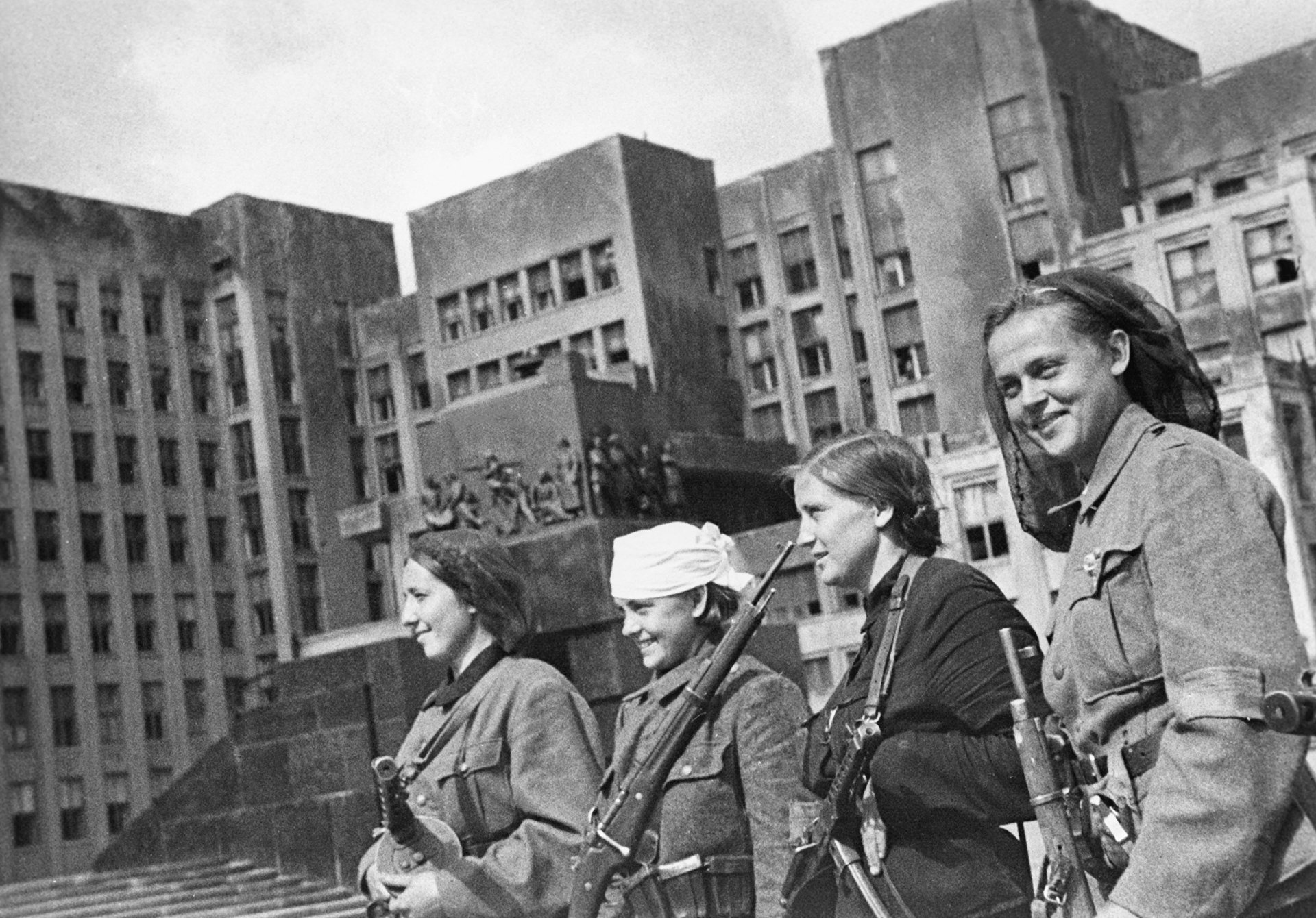
Soviet partisans on Independence Square, July-August 1944

In the Soviet era, military parades in honor of International Workers' Day (1 May) (until 1969), Victory Day (9 May), and October Revolution Day (7 November) took place on the square since it was used as the city's general parade venue until 1984. The First Secretary of the Communist Party of Belarus and members of the politburo would get on top of a grandstand in front of a statue of Lenin. These types of parades would go on until 1989. The first parade of the independent Republic of Belarus was on Independence Square in 1995, in honor of golden jubilee of the signing of the German Instrument of Surrender.

=== Demonstrations ===
In the Soviet era, many pro-Communist rallies took place. A rally in honor of the 100th birthday of Vladimir Lenin was held at the square on 22 April 1970. Rallies in honor of Minsk's 900th anniversary also took place in 1967.

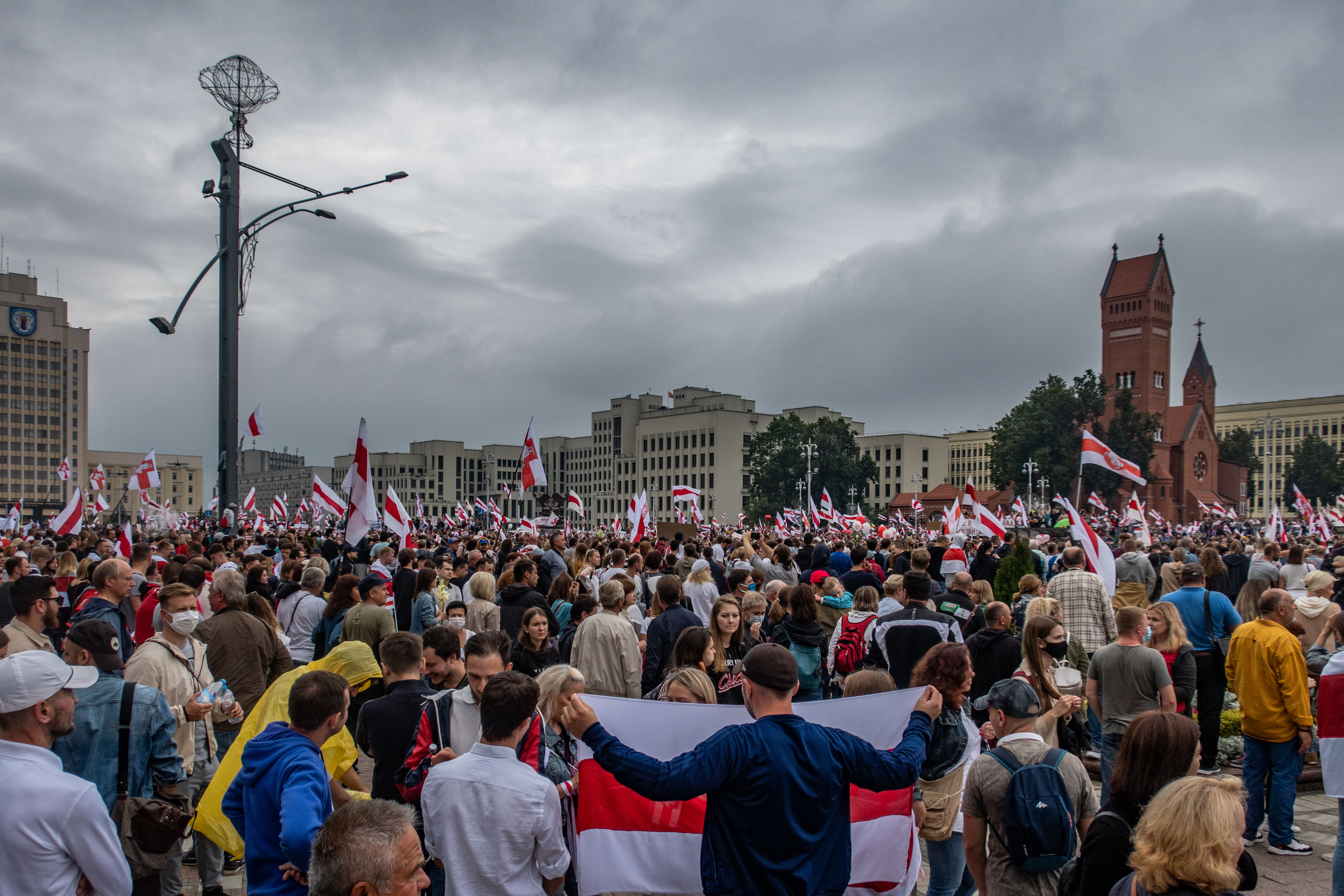
Anti-Lukashenko protest rally on 23 August 2020

==== 2020 protests ====
During the 2020 Belarusian protests, the square was an area where many rallies occurred. President Lukashenko addressed supporters of him on the square hours before tens of thousands of opposition protesters began gathering in the same area. Lukashenko told his supporters "to defend your country and its independence". Lukashenko's son Nikolai was compared to a bodyguard due to him wearing a jacket, white shirt and sunglasses. During the protests, many shouted and chanted "Leave!", referring to demands for Lukashenko's resignation.

On 9 August, the Minsk City Police Department closed central Independence Square in front of the buildings of the government and the Central Election Commission.

=== Other ===
In 1980, the state funeral of the First Secretary of the Communist Party of Byelorussia Pyotr Masherov took place on the square. On 8 September 1992, the Minsk Higher Military Engineering School and the Minsk Higher Military Command School (now the unified Military Academy of Belarus) were the first to take the military oath of allegiance to the armed forces, with their induction ceremony being held on Independence Square in the presence of defense minister Pavel Kozlovskii.

== Landmarks ==
=== Buildings ===
Building	Architectural details	Function(s)
Supreme Soviet Government House #1	It stands behind a statue of Vladimir Lenin and is one of the few buildings that survived the Great Patriotic War. It was built in 1934 and designed by Iosif Langbard.	It is one of the highest organs of state power in Belarus. The Supreme Council is the continuation of the Supreme Soviet of the BSSR. It acts as the functioning parliament for Belarus.
Church of Saints Simon and Helena	This church was created by Polish architects Tomasz Pajzderski and Władysław Marconi, with construction starting in 1905 and ending in 1910. It is known as the Red Church for its red exterior, made from bricks from Częstochowa.	It is a Roman Catholic church, but in the Soviet era the church was used as a cinema. Mass is celebrated in Belarusian, Polish, Lithuanian, and Latin.
Belarusian State University	It was created by architects I. Zaporozhets and G. Lavrov. The main building of BSU was completed in 1962. There are 16 Faculties within BSU. 4 of those institutes are Educational Institutes that provide training on either undergraduate or post-graduate levels of education.	The BSU is a higher education institution in Minsk.
Minsk City Council	The City council building was made by architects S. Musinski and G. Sysoev in 1964.	The Council decides on the economy, market reforms, external economic activity enterprises and organizations of transport and communication, housing, communal services and power engineering, city planning, services industry, public health services, physical training, sport and tourism, education and culture, social security and public relations.

=== Others ===
- Maxim Tank Belarusian State Pedagogical University
- Minsk Metro headquarters
- Minsk Mayor’s Office
- Former commercial apartment buildings of the early 20th century
- Lenin Statue outside the Government headquarter
- Shopping mall "Stoliсa" (located underground)
