= Gorky Park (Minsk) =

Park in Minsk, Belarus

Coordinates: 53°54′15″N 27°34′17″E

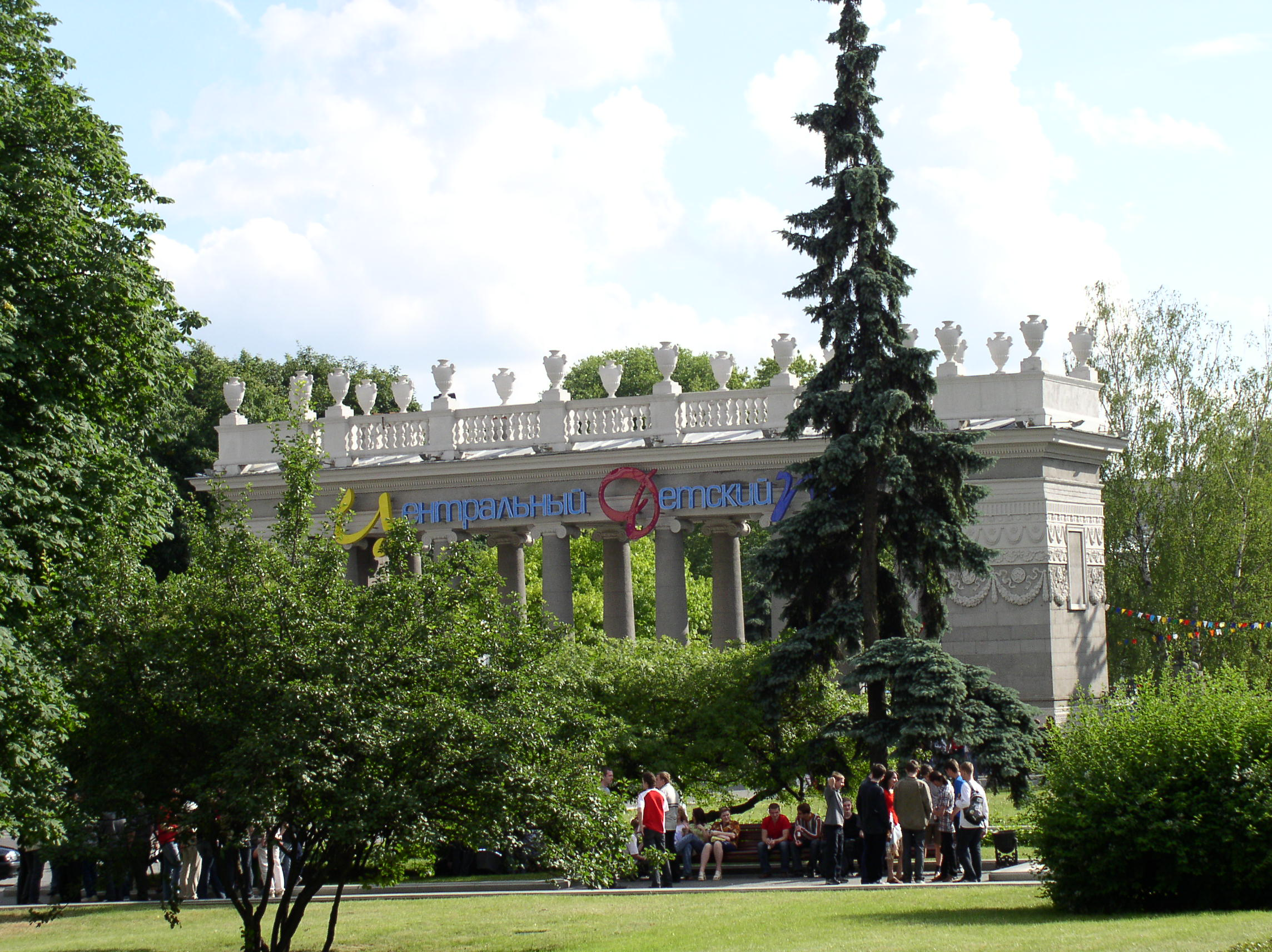
Gorky Park: Entrance

Gorky Park (Парк Горкага, Цэнтральны дзіцячы парк імя Максіма Горкага, Maksim Gorky Central Children's Park) is a public park in Minsk, Belarus.

It is located near the Victory Square and the Yanka Kupala Park.

The park was established in 1800 under the name Governor's Garden. During the Soviet times it was renamed "парк культуры і адпачынку імя Максіма Горкага" (Park of culture and recreation after A.M. Gorky) after the famous Russian/Soviet writer Maksim Gorky. Parks with this name have been established in many cities of the Soviet Union.

A part of the park's territory is occupied by an amusement park with a 56-meter-high (184 ft) Ferris wheel. It also has an educational observatory with planetarium.

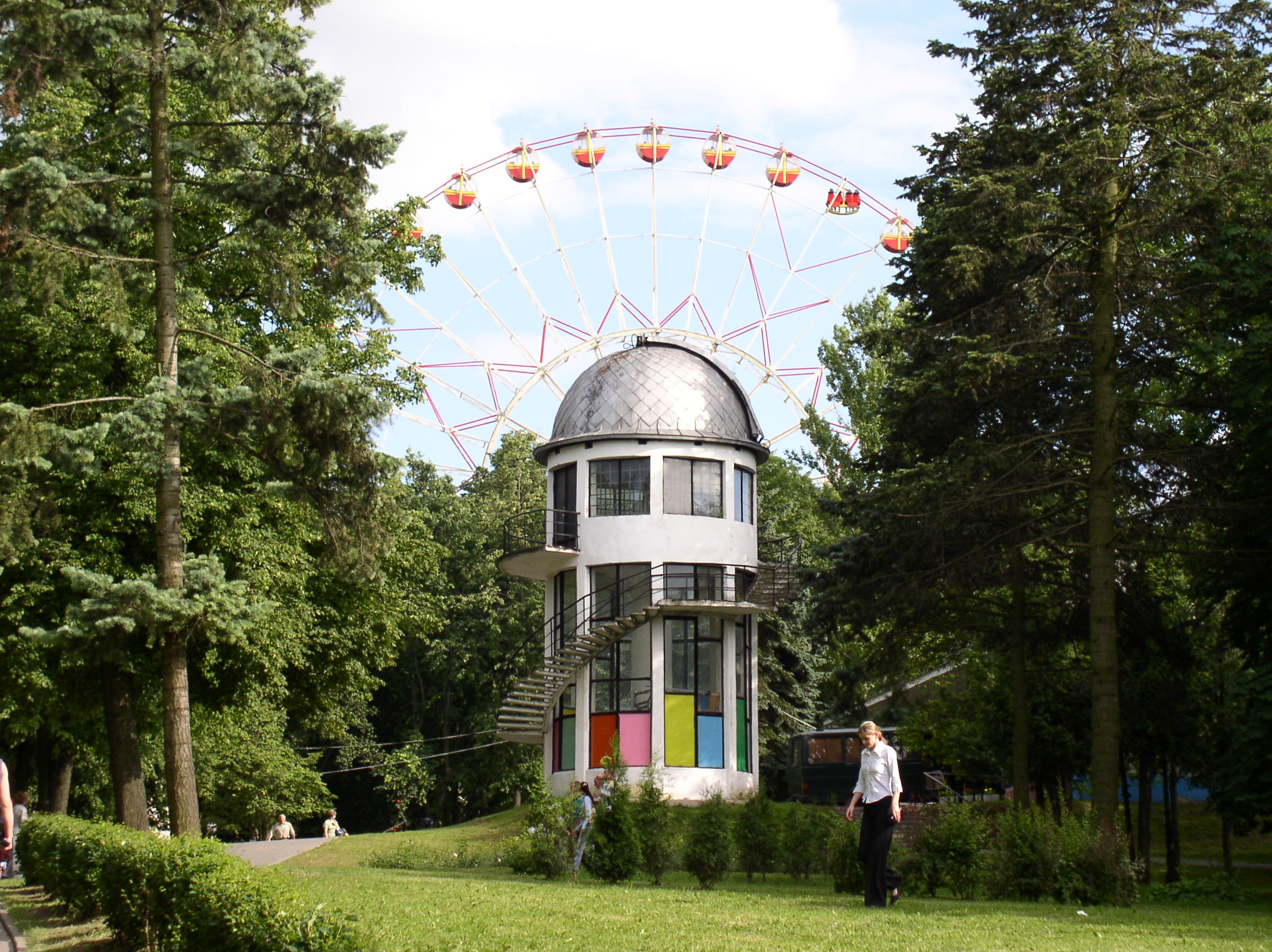
Gorky Park: The observatory and a Ferris wheel

The Ice Palace (indoor skating rink) is also located in Gorky Park. President Lukashenko, known for his hobby of ice hockey, frequents this place, at which times the access to this part of the park is closed for general public.
