= Central House of Officers (Minsk) =

Culturally-significant building in Minsk, Belarus

- Belarusian: Цэнтральны Дом афiцэраў Russian: Центральный Дом офицеров
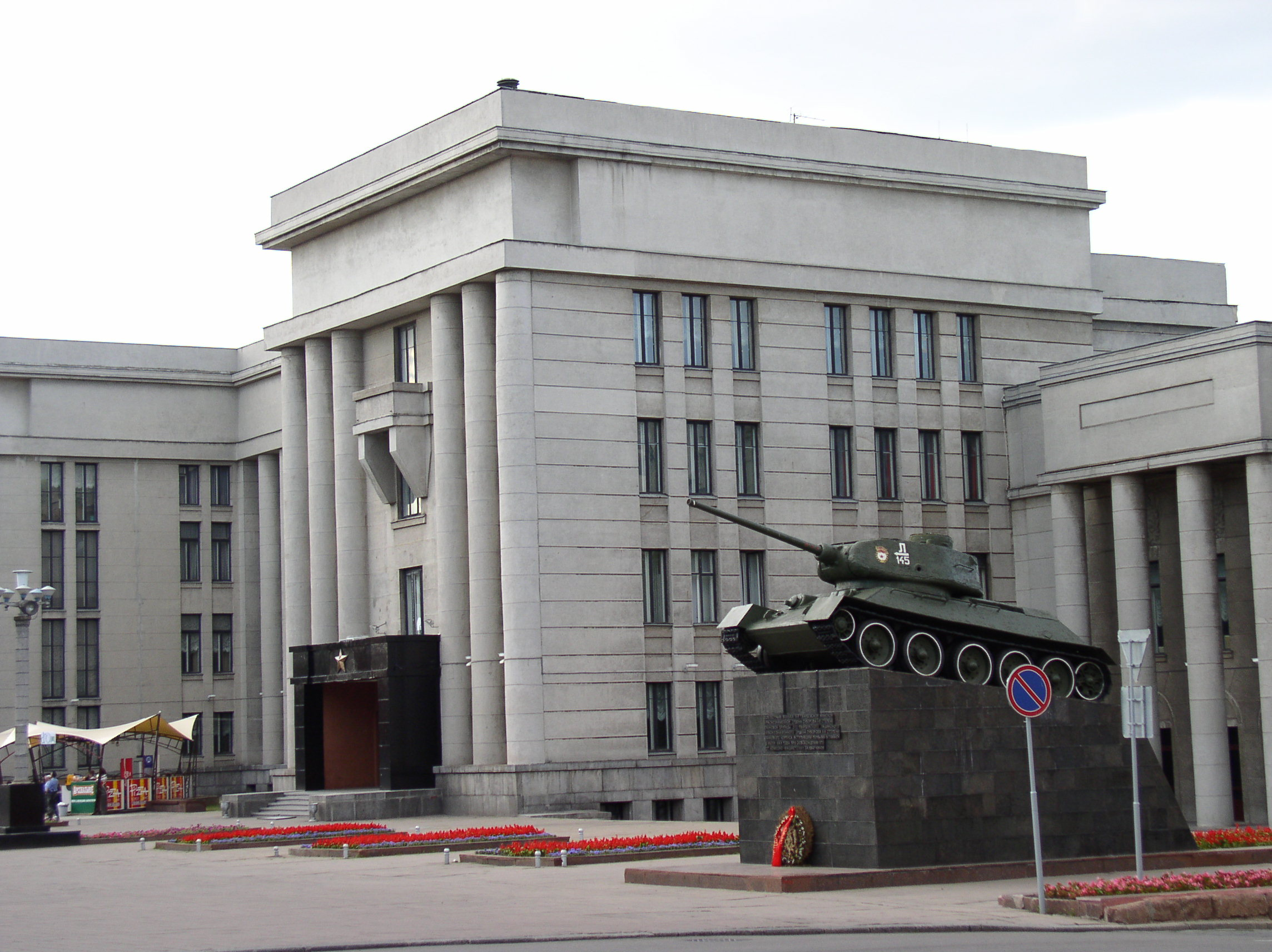
- The Army Palace next to a T-34-85 monument in July 2005.
- Interactive map of the Central House of Officers area

General information
- Location: October Square, Minsk, Belarus
- Coordinates: 53°54′8″N 27°33′54″E
- Construction started: 1934
- Completed: 1939
- Opened: 1939
- Owner: Armed Forces of Belarus

Design and construction
- Architect: Iosif Langbard

The Central House of Officers (Belarusian: Цэнтральны Дом афiцэраў, romanized: Centraĺny Dom aficeraŭ, Russian: Центральный Дом офицеров), also known as the Army Palace, is a former Red Army building which currently serves as the main cultural institution of the Belarusian Armed Forces built in 1939. It was one of the only buildings built by Soviet architect Iosif Langbard that survived World War II.

It presents historical education and promotes the moral readiness of the military by familiarizing servicemen and the general public. Events that fall under this task includes weddings, concerts, musical and theatrical performances, and lectures. The current Head of the Central House of Officers is Colonel Valeriy Kurda.

== History ==
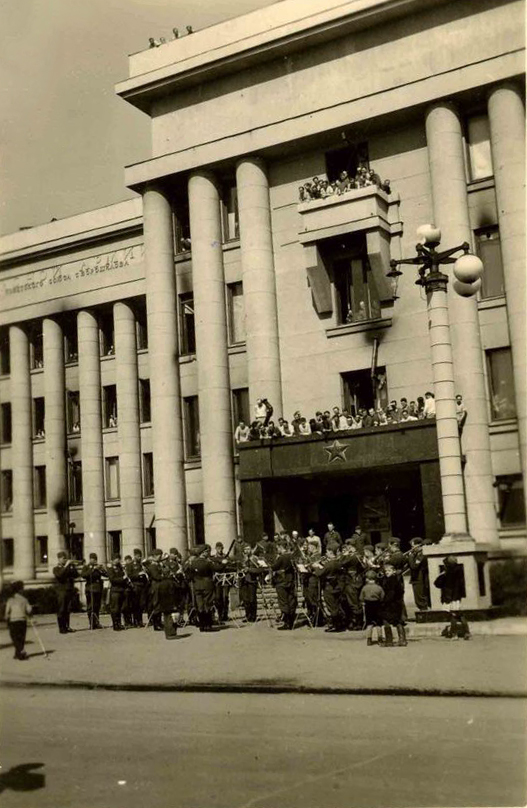
A military band at the House of Officers in 1941

=== 1920s and 30s ===
By order of the Western Military District in April 1925, the House of the Red Army and Fleet in Minsk began the process of being built. On May 22, 1933, the Council of People's Commissars of the Belarusian SSR adopted a resolution on the establishment of a civilian council to assist in the construction of the building. Most of the design was entrusted to Soviet Belarusian architect and Honored Artist of the Byelorussian SSR, Iosif Langbard. The day after Red Army Day was celebrated in 1934, a site adjacent to the House of Bishops was chosen as the place where the grounds of the House of the Red Army would be located. The house was built by rebuilding the Pokrovskaya (Krestovaya) church of the former bishop's monastery. By September 1936, the theater hall of the house still under construction. On 18 September of that year, the building was opened to troop and commanders of the Minsk Military District and the local garrison, as well as residents of the Belarusian capital. In September 1939, when the district headquarters relocated from the city of Smolensk to Minsk, the house acquired district status.

=== Second World War ===
On 3 July 1944, the building was heavily damaged during the Minsk Offensive by the Wehrmacht. Three floors were severely damaged due to fires that started as a result of the explosions. After the liberation of Minsk, the restoration work of building was underway. The adjacent territory was cleared of debris and an exhibition of samples of German military equipment was placed on it. A T-34 tank was found near the main entrance to the building to the exhibition on a high pedestal, where it still stands today.

=== Post-War ===
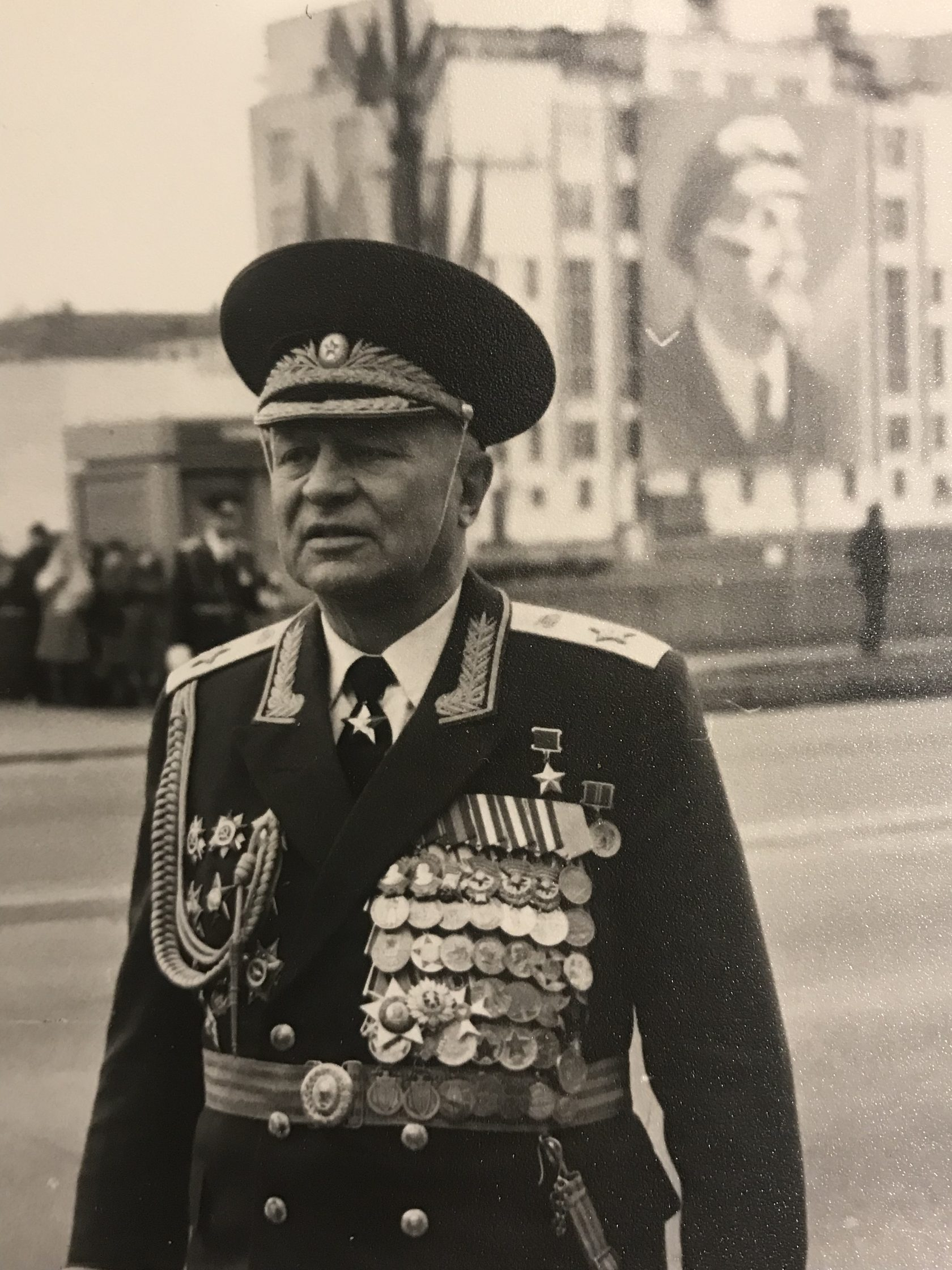
General Oleg Losik at the House of Officers, 9 May 1985.

In autumn of 1945, the building began the process of resuming its regular duties. In August 1946, it was renamed to the House of Officers of the Soviet Army of the Belarusian Military District. By 1948, the restoration of the pool and sports halls was completed. In the mid-1980s, it was one of the leading cultural institutions of the Soviet Army, with significant events as the meeting of the Committee of Ministers of Defense of the Warsaw Pact and the International Festival of Military Cinema being held there. In 1974, the Museum of the History of the Belorussian Military District was opened in the house. This same year, the entire building was renovated, giving its current look. On February 25, 1982, the Minsk Military District Officers House was renamed to the Minsk Officers' House. Since August 11, 1992, the institution has been referred to as the Central House of Officers of the Armed Forces of the Republic of Belarus and was made into a state-protected institution in November 2002.

== Structure ==
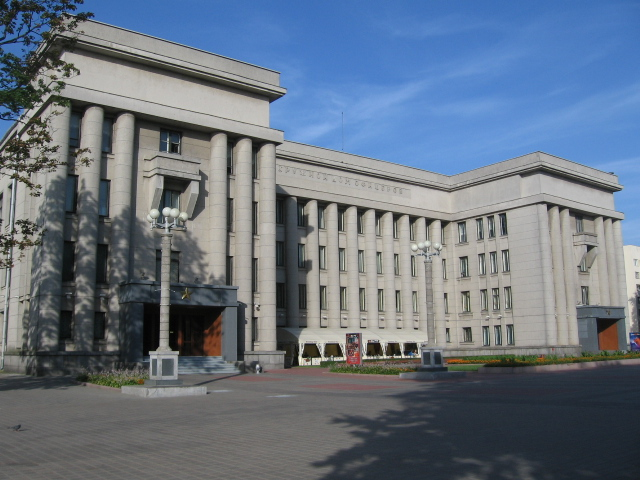

- Cultural and methodological center (created in January 1995)
- Center of ideological work (created on July 1, 2004)
- Central Military Library (restored on February 15, 1944)
- Military Translators Course (opened on November 20, 1944)
- Studio of military artists (created on December 12, 2003)
- Military Art Writers Studio (created in mid-2003)
- Drama Theatre of the Belarusian Army (created in 2003)
- Public Association "Belarusian Union of Officers" (created in September 1992)
- Military Scientific Society (created in 1925)
