= Palace of the Republic, Minsk =

Palace of the Republic
- Палац Рэспублікі; Дворец Республики
- Palace of the Republic
- Interactive map of the Palace of the Republic area

General information
- Location: Kastryčnickaja plošča 1, Minsk 220030, Belarus
- Coordinates: 53.9033°N 27.5603°E
- Construction started: 1985
- Completed: December 31, 2001

Design and construction
- Architects: M. Pirogov, V. Danilov, L. Zdanevich, L. Moskalevich, V. Novikov, N. Turlyuk, V. Usimov, A. Shabalin

Other information
- Seating capacity: 2,700 (Large auditorium)

The Palace of the Republic (Belarusian: Палац Рэспублікі, romanized: Palac Respubliki; Russian: Дворец Республики, romanized: Dvorets Respubliki) is a palatial government building in Minsk, Belarus. It is used for official state functions including forums, meetings, conventions, multi-genre concerts, symphony orchestras, and New Year's events.

== Background ==
According to its official website, the idea for this building was conceptualised by Pyotr Masherov, first secretary of the central committee of the Communist Party of Belarus. In 1982, a competition was conducted to produce a design for the building. Belgosproject produced the winning design. Construction began in 1985 but came to a halt as a result of the political upheaval caused by the fall of the Soviet Union.

Construction restarted in 1995 by the order of Alexander Lukashenko, the first elected president of the newly formed Republic of Belarus. Building work was completed in October 1997 and the palace became fully operational on the last day of 2001 and features a 2,700-seat auditorium, a 500-seat indoor amphitheater, a press center, and several conference halls.
