= October Square, Minsk =

City square in Minsk, Belarus

Coordinates: 53°54′09″N 27°33′41″E

October Square
- Kastryčnickaja plošča

- Native name: Кастрычніцкая плошча (Belarusian)
- Former name: Central Square
- Type: Square
- Location: Independence Avenue, Minsk
- Nearest metro station: Kastryčnickaja (Кастрычніцкая)

Construction
- Construction start: 1949
- Completion: 1961

Other
- Known for: Being a central square in Minsk

October Square (Russian: Октябрьская площадь; Belarusian: Кастрычніцкая плошча) is a square in the center of Minsk, Belarus, which is located between Independence Avenue, Engels streets and International Street. To its east side there are areas limited to buildings of the Palace of Culture of Trade Unions, the Museum of the Great Patriotic War and the Minsk Palace of Republic. Around the Square is the Central House of Officers, the residence of the President of Belarus, and the Janka Kupała National Academic Theater. On the square there are the main metro stations in Minsk: Kastryčnickaja and Kupawaŭskaja.

== History ==
In September 1952, a monument to Soviet leader Joseph Stalin was installed on the square with a height of 10 metres (33 ft). In 1957, between the main square and central park were government stands, from which the party and state leadership of the BSSR reviewed military parades and welcomed the demonstrations on International Workers' Day, Victory Day, and October Revolution Day. Therefore, the square acquired the status of the city's main square. On 3 November 1961, Stalin's monument was demolished, and in 1966 the area was replaced by the opening of a museum built in honor of the Great Patriotic War. In 1984, the area was renamed to October Square and construction of the Palace began on it, which dragged on for 17 years, resulting in Lenin Square having regained the status as the official central square of the city.

== Activities on the square ==
After independence, the area was often the venue for concerts and festivals, as well as socio-political action, in which the area is decorated with the appropriate decorations. Since 2000, the centre of the square has hosted the highest artificial Christmas tree in the country (height 30 metres (98 ft), diameter 18 metres (59 ft)) around which the skating-rink and above the area carried out a festive illumination.

In 2002, the Minsk Independence Day Parade was held on the square for the first time, being the first parade that took place on October Square since 1984. In March 2017, the centennial of the Belarusian Militsiya was celebrated with a parade of the personnel of the country's Ministry of Internal Affairs on October Square. The tradition of holding military ceremonies on the square after presidential inaugurations began in 2001. On Freedom Day in 2006, the AMAP stormed an opposition tent at October Square without provocation, violently ending the peaceful Jeans Revolution against President Alexander Lukashenko. Hundreds of thousands of people were beaten and detained on the square, including opposition presidential candidate Alaksandr Kazulin.

== Buildings ==
- Palace of the Republic – The central building on October Square. It is used for conferences, congresses and performances.
- Museum of the Great Patriotic War (the museum was later moved to Victors Avenue)
- Residence of the President of Belarus – The Residence of the incumbent President of Belarus was converted from the former building of the Central Committee of the Communist Party of Belarus to the presidential palace in 1994.
- Central House of Officers – The house of officers was a former red army house built in 1939. It was one of the only buildings built by Soviet architect Josif Langbard that survived the war.
- Trade Unions Palace of Culture

== Photos ==
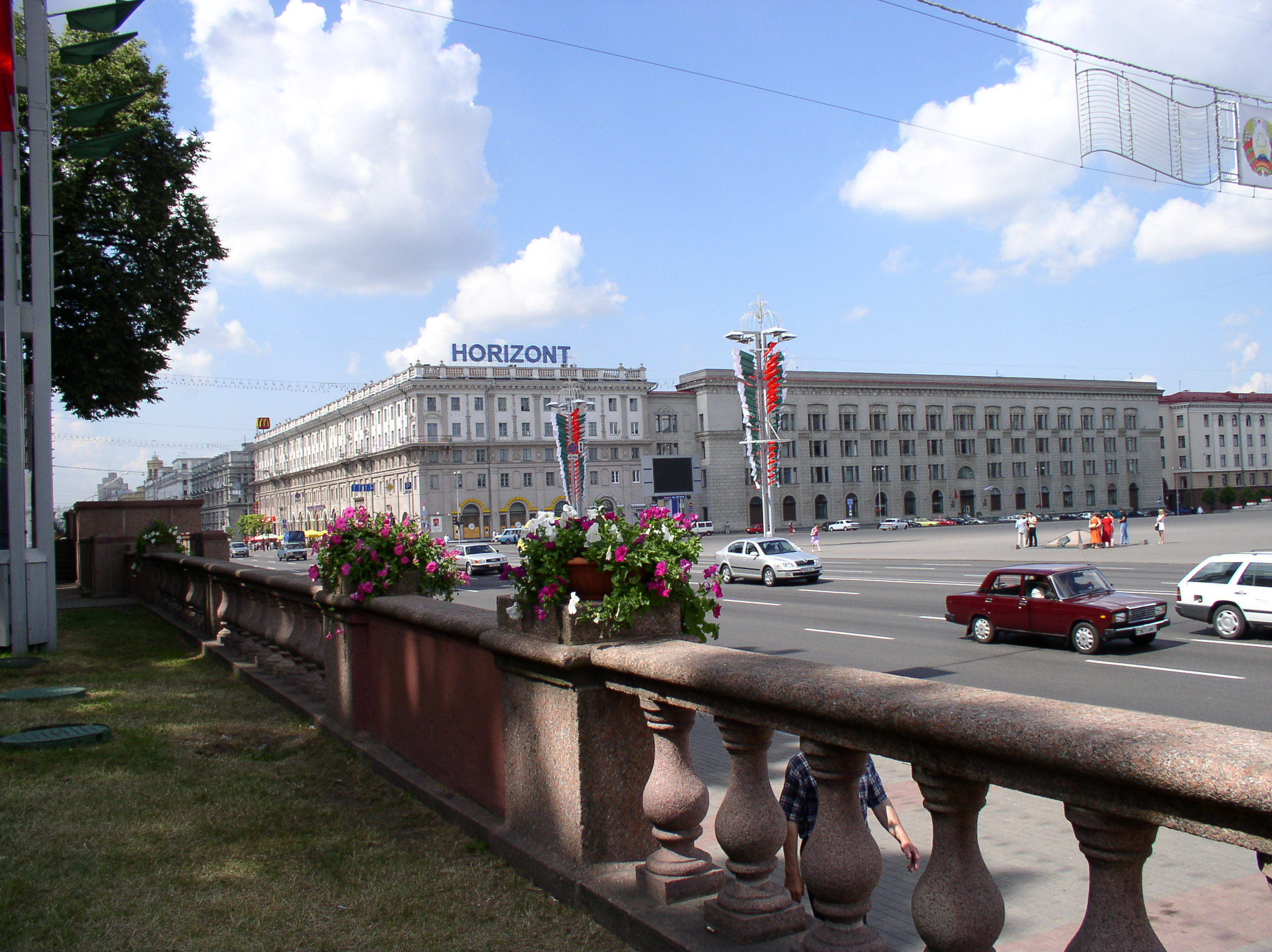

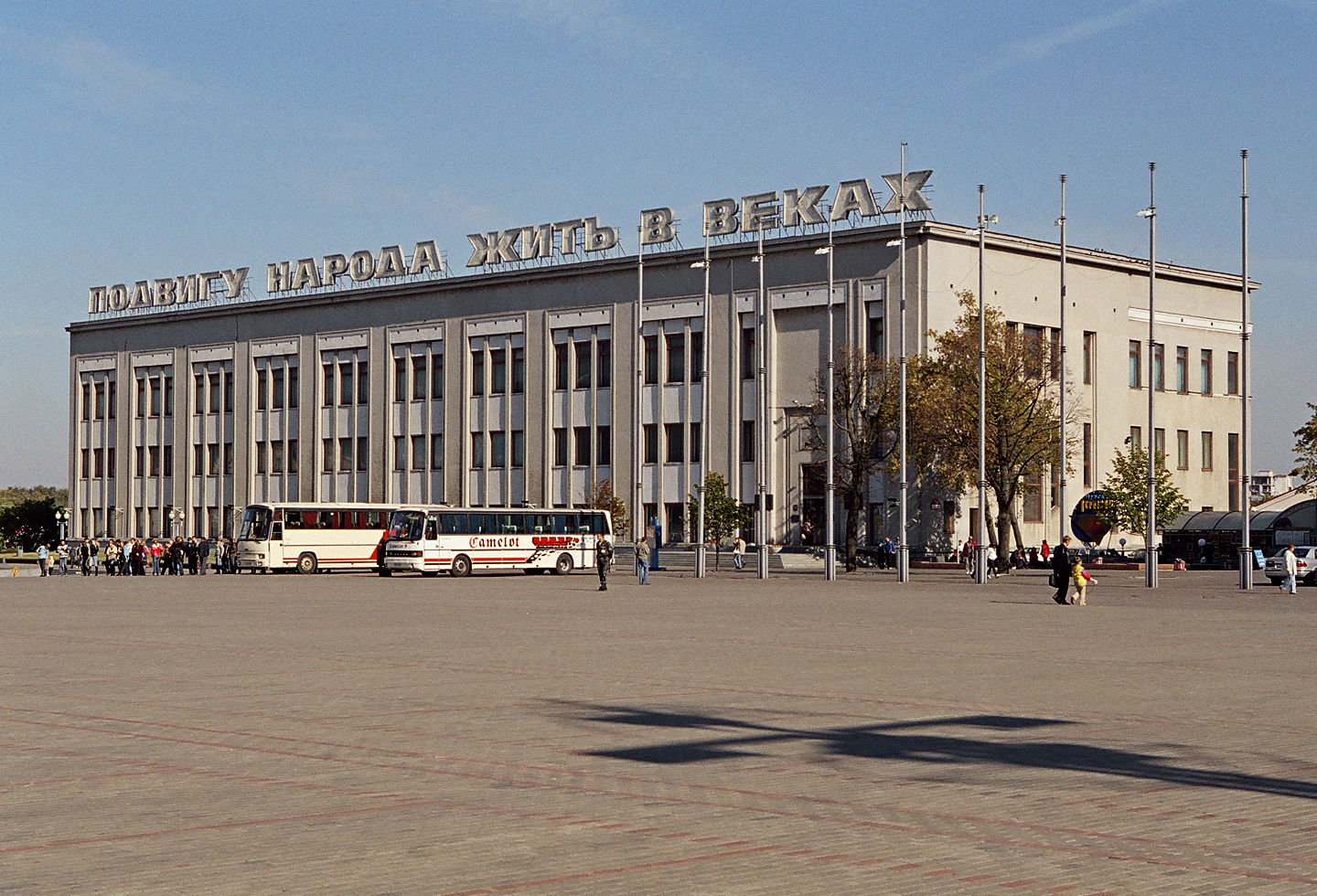

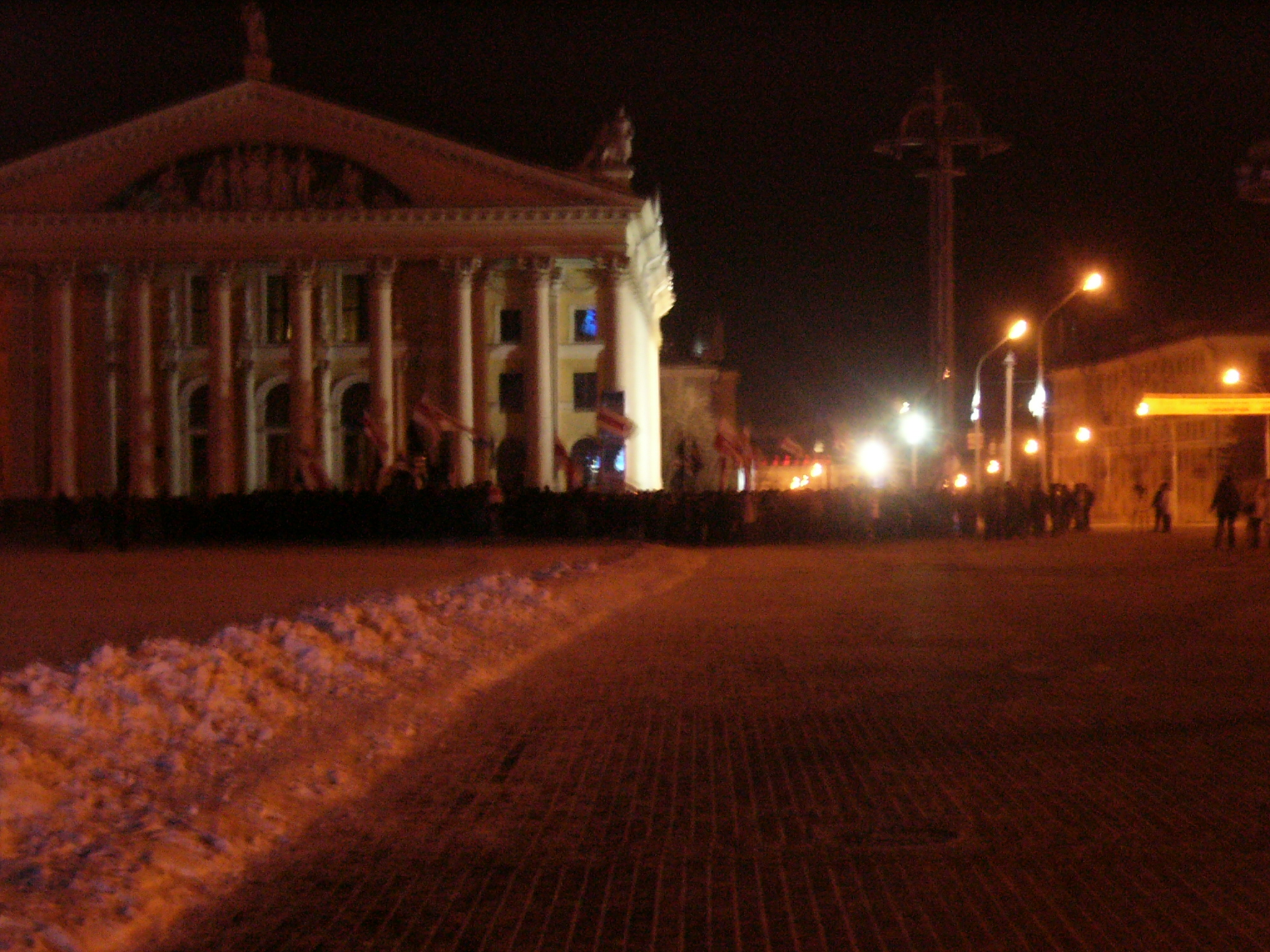

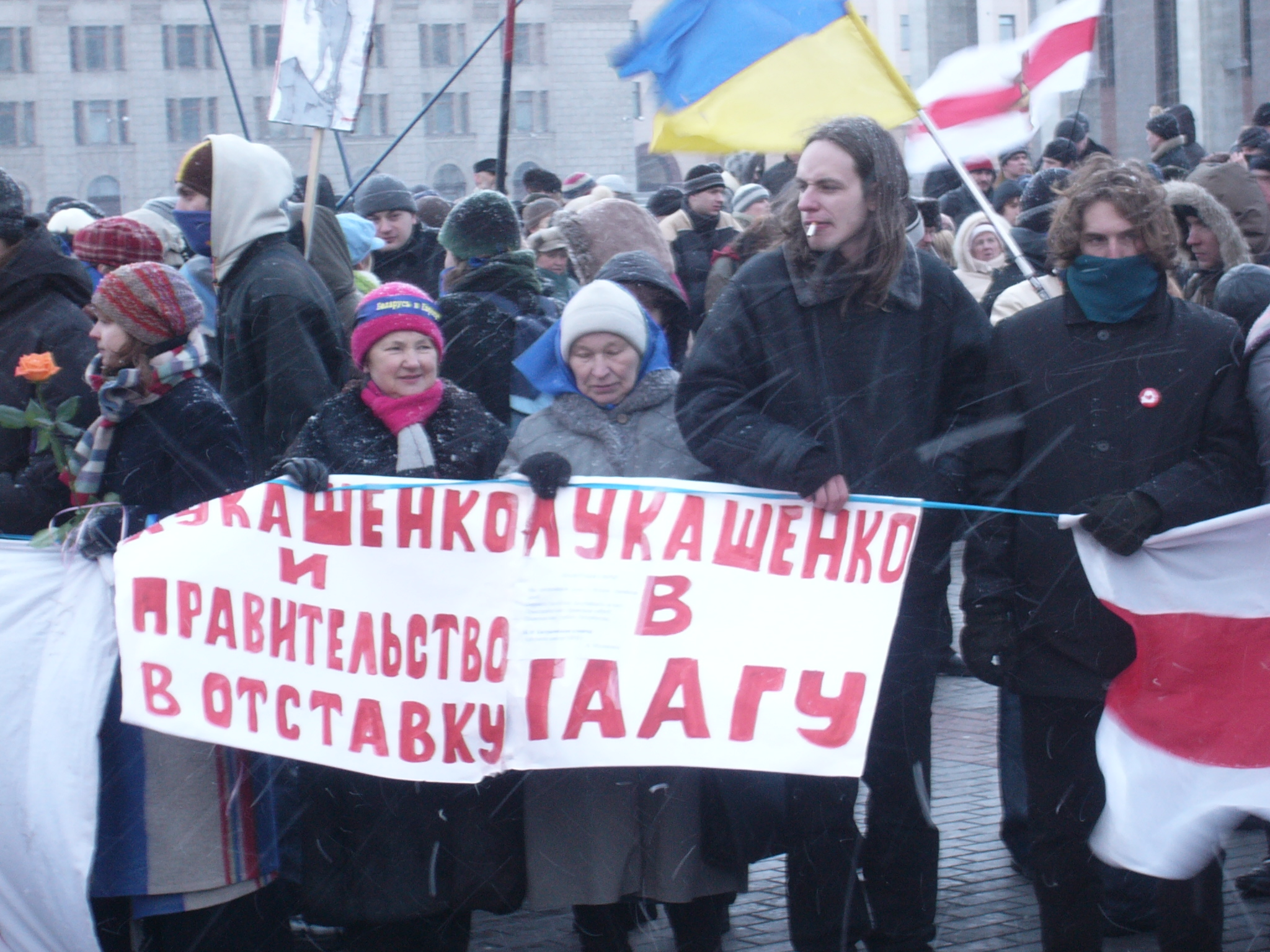

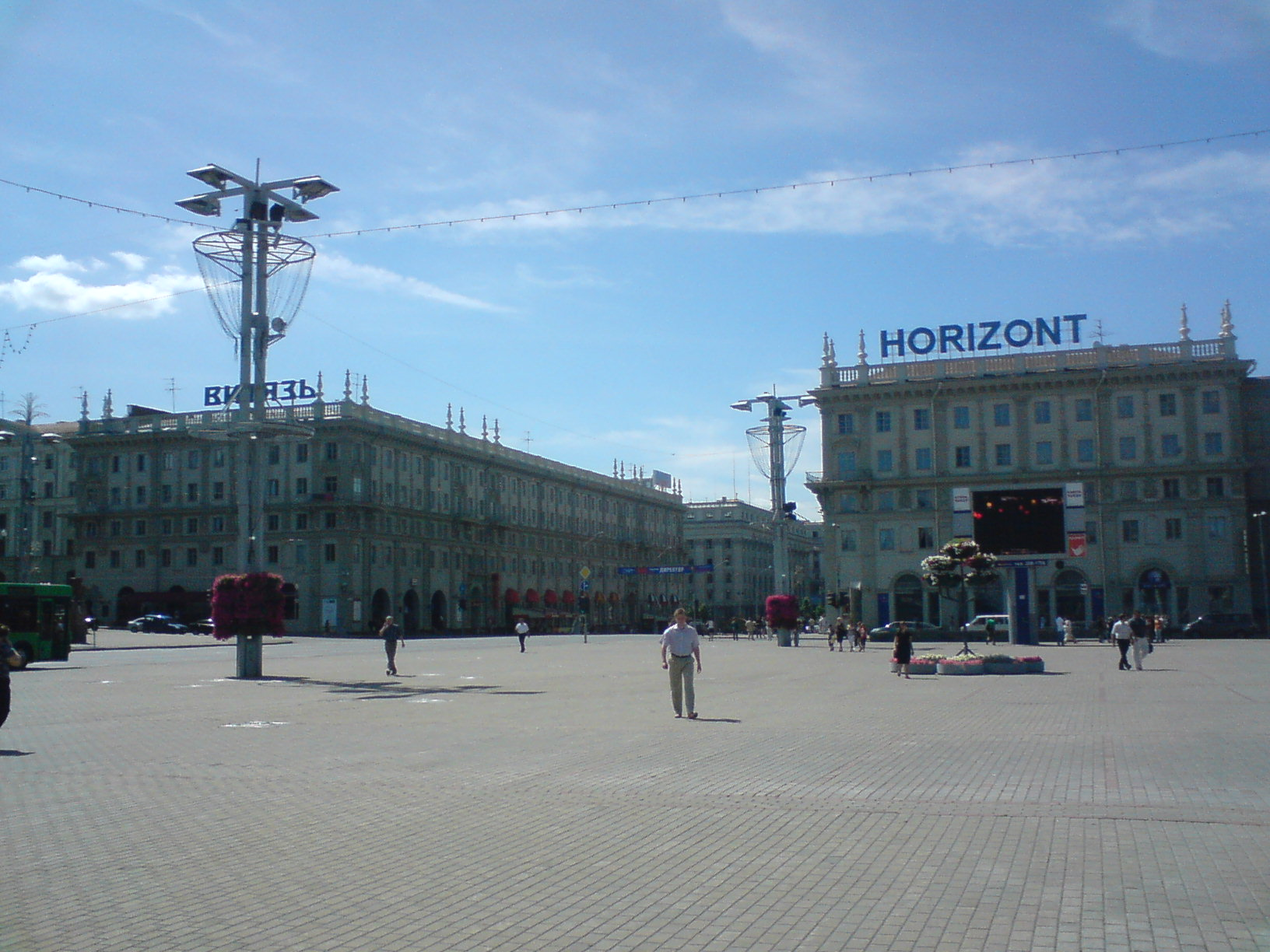
