= Polish Society "Oświata" =

1905 Polish social organization in Minsk

Polish Society "Oświata" Polskie Towarzystwo "Oświata"
- Leader: Michalina Łęska, Mieczysław Porowski (1905–1907); Father Kazimierz Michalkiewicz (1907–1908); Mieczysław Porowski (1908–1917)
- Founded: 1905
- Dissolved: December 5, 1909 (after that date continued underground activities until 1917)
- Headquarters: Minsk
- Ideology: spreading Polishness through education

The Polish Society "Oświata" (also known as the Society "Oświata" and "Oświata") was a Polish social organization founded in 1905, operating in Minsk and in the Minsk Governorate of the Russian Empire. Until 1907, its activities were carried out clandestinely, legally from 1907 to 1909, and then again clandestinely. The society aimed to educate the inhabitants of the Minsk region, especially children, in the spirit of Polishness, as well as to disseminate Polish culture, language, and strengthen national consciousness in these lands. The organization was persecuted, and during its legal activity, it was treated with hostility by the Russian authorities because strengthening Polish identity in the annexed lands contradicted the state administration's strategy of Russification and assimilation.

== Poles in Minsk and Minsk Governorate ==
At the turn of the 19th and 20th centuries, the Polish-speaking population and/or those declaring Polish nationality constituted a significant minority in Minsk and the Minsk Governorate. According to the census organized in 1897 in the Russian Empire, in the city of Minsk, people considering Polish as their native language accounted for 11.4% of the population, being the third largest linguistic group after those speaking Yiddish (51.2%) and Russian (25.5%). In the entire Minsk Governorate, according to the same census, people considering Polish as their native language constituted 3% of the population, trailing behind Belarusian (76%), Yiddish (16%), and Russian (3.9%). In absolute numbers, according to the census, there were 10,369 Polish-speaking individuals in Minsk and 64,617 in the Minsk Governorate. According to the census conducted in December 1919 in the territories administered by the Civil Administration of the Eastern Lands (the temporary Polish administration during the Polish–Soviet War), Poles constituted 18.3% of the population in Minsk, being the third ethnic group after Jews (44.9%) and Belarusians (22.9%). In the entire Minsk District, according to the same census, Poles constituted 14.6% of the population, second only to Belarusians (64.5%). In absolute numbers, there were 18,713 Poles in Minsk and 159,706 in the Minsk District.

== Circumstances of creation ==
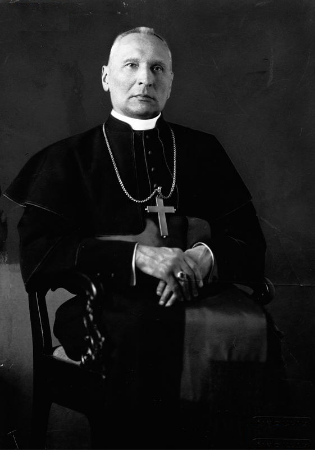
Father Kazimierz Mikołaj Michalkiewicz – president of "Oświata" from 1907 to 1908

On 12 December 1904, with the advent of the so-called "liberal times" in the Russian Empire, a tsarist decree was issued partially lifting restrictions on the teaching of the Polish language. It allowed for its instruction in Russian elementary and secondary schools as an optional subject, conducted outside of mandatory class hours, for an additional high fee. This fee was higher the fewer parents expressed a desire to send their children to such classes. Such conditions did not meet the educational needs of the Polish community residing in the Minsk Governorate. They expected not only the teaching of the native language to their children but also education in a Polish patriotic spirit. Therefore, efforts were made to establish educational institutions with a purely Polish character.

In mid-1905, the illegal Polish Society "Oświata" was established in Minsk. Its founders were Father Kazimierz Michalkiewicz, Jan Offenberg, Michalina Łęska, and Mieczysław Porowski. The society's activity mainly involved coordinating and expanding Polish clandestine education, which, according to reports from the tsarist police, was widespread in the Minsk Governorate. On 4 March 1906, a decree facilitating the establishment of social organizations was issued. In connection with this, Polish educational activists in Minsk decided to engage in public activities, which in their opinion could bring much better results. The Polish Society "Oświata" was officially registered by the Russian authorities on 11 January 1907. On March 12, a founding meeting took place, during which, according to witnesses, there was a general excitement and eagerness to work. The organization's statute was adopted, and the first board was elected. It included: president – Father Kazimierz Mikołaj Michalkiewicz, vice president – doctor Jan Offenberg, secretary – doctor Czesław Grabowiecki, treasurer – lawyer Zygmunt Węcławowicz. After Father Michalkiewicz left Minsk in 1908, the position of president remained vacant, and his duties were performed by the then vice president Mieczysław Porowski. The Society's Council also included priests: Kazimierz Bukraba, Adam Lisowski, and I. Krukowski.

== Program ==
According to the statute, the organization's program aimed at the intellectual and moral upliftment of all layers of the Polish society in the Minsk Governorate. Its implementation was to take place through comprehensive cultural and educational activities, including the establishment of Polish schools, running a library, organizing lectures, and summer camps for children. However, in practice, the intention to open Polish schools could not be realized because it required the approval of the Russian authorities each time. Throughout the entire period of the society's legal operation, Russian officials never once granted permission to open a Polish school in the Minsk region and in other territories of the former Polish–Lithuanian Commonwealth to the east of Minsk.

== Structure and operations ==
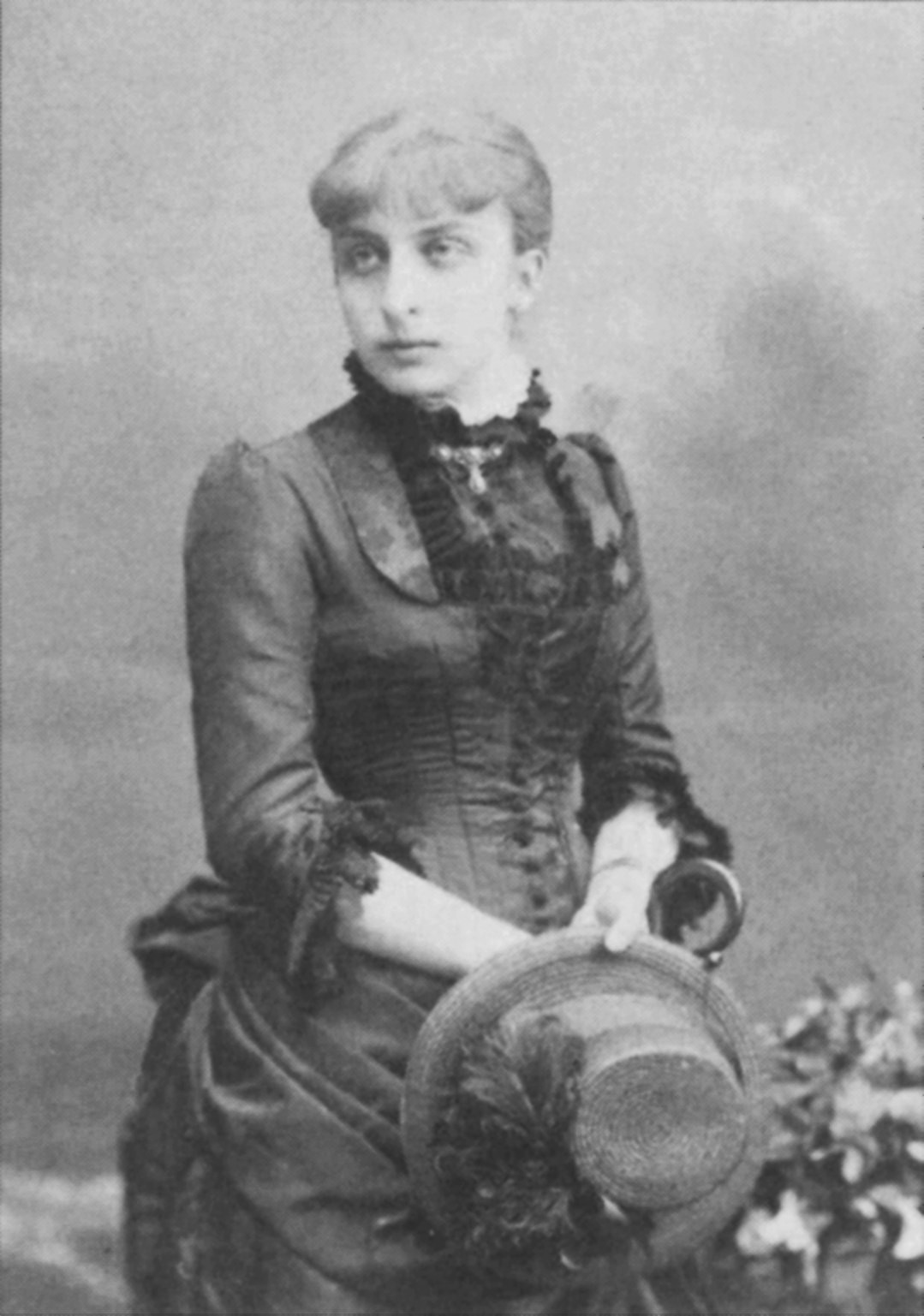
Jadwiga Kostrowicka – initiator, among other things, of running children's camps of "Oświata" in Sawicze

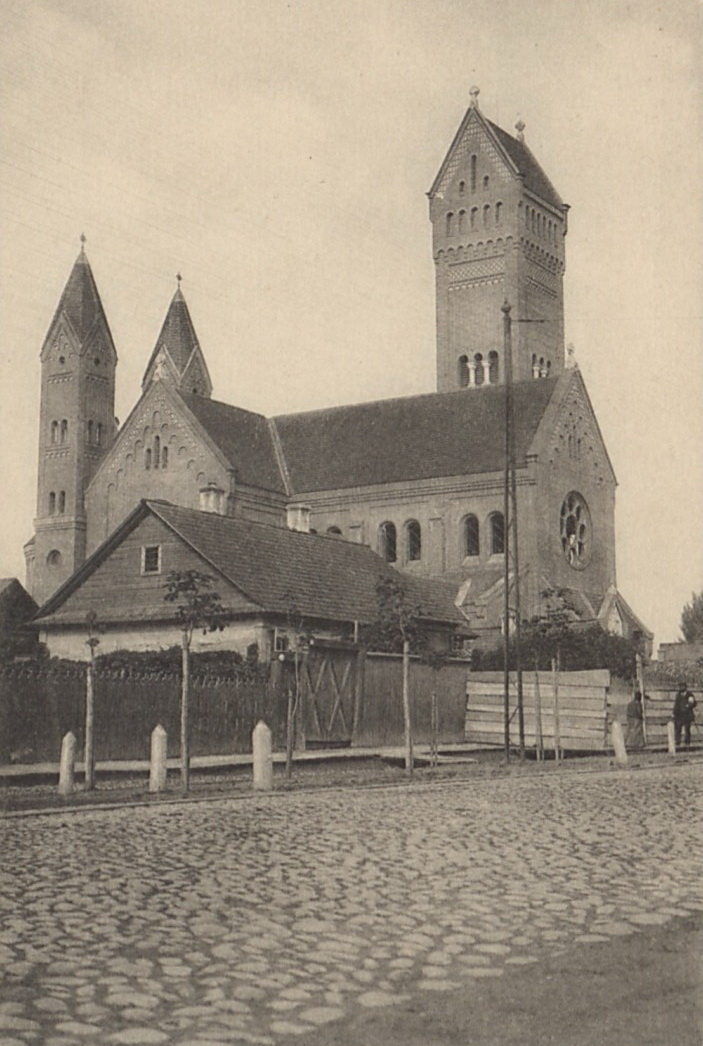
The wooden rectory building of the Church of Saints Simon and Helena in Minsk, which in 1915 housed the library of "Oświata"

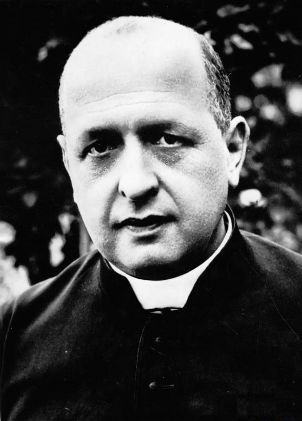
Father Kazimierz Bukraba – member of the Council of "Oświata", organizer of illegal Polish teaching

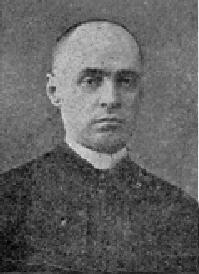
Father Adam Lisowski – member of the Council of "Oświata"

The society had its main headquarters in Minsk and five provincial branches: in Mazyr, Pinsk, Uzda, Novogrudok, and Rakaw. It was divided into sections dealing with various areas of activity: elementary education, adult literacy education, teacher training seminars, summer camps, lectures, libraries, book lending, and financial:

- The section for elementary education focused on teaching children in secret classes. This was illegal activity. The education had a coordinated character and was based on a uniform curriculum. Due to the conditions of secrecy, its exact scope is not known. According to Mieczysław Porowski, there were approximately half a thousand children taught in 32 groups in Minsk. In the initial period of the society's existence, this work was not heavily pursued by the authorities. However, in 1911, with the increasing effectiveness of police repression, the number of students decreased, for example, in Minsk to around 400.
- The section for adult literacy education taught illiterate adults reading and writing skills, and introduced them to social work. In Minsk, about 180 people were taught with its help, mainly craftsmen.
- The teacher training seminar section focused on preparing female teachers for educational work among the people. This activity was significant because the expansion of educational activities created a significant demand for female teachers, and at the same time, few candidates had suitable qualifications, especially in terms of proficiency in the Polish language. Therefore, the section aimed to conduct fast training courses. From the beginning to the end of its existence, it operated illegally. It was led by Michalina Łęska and Anna Czekotowska. Initially, in December 1905, there were six-month courses for female teachers opened in Minsk. Soon, the illegal Polish Society "Oświata" took over the supervision, gradually transforming them into teacher training seminars. It had two departments: completing the higher one gave the title of a people's teacher, while the lower one – so-called "rural" teacher. The most involved person in this venture was Michalina Łęska, who dealt with organizational matters of the seminar, conducted classes, and helped weaker students. The teacher training courses included subjects strictly related to promoting Polishness (Polish language, history and literature, Catholic religion) as well as other disciplines: nature, arithmetic, singing, children's games, pedagogy, and methodology. Participants also familiarized themselves with popular publications. However, Belarusian and Russian issues were treated in a specific way. Although Belarusian and Russian languages were taught, support for the Belarusian national movement was not provided. Teachers expressing opinions that schools should be non-denominational or conducted in the Belarusian language were sidelined from work. The seminar ceased its activities in 1911 due to the intensified fight against illegal Polish education by the Russian police.
- The section for summer camps was created for the poorest children from cities, e.g., from Minsk. It organized summer camps for them on the estates of landowners, e.g., in Sawicze, Ustron, Nacza, and Ihnatycze. Their aim was the mental and physical development of the children educated. Jadwiga Kostrowicka, the sister of Edward Woyniłłowicz, was the initiator of running camps in Sawicz.
- The lecture section aimed to disseminate Polish culture through presentations, lectures, and popular talks. Its activities began on 29 April 1907. It was led by Jan Offenberg, and provincial branches of "Oświata" took an active part in it. For example, the Pinsk branch dealt exclusively with organizing lectures on Polish literature and vocabulary, which, according to a report by the Russian police, contributed to the growth of Polish national consciousness. Events organized by the lecture section were highly popular among the audience.
- The library and book lending section were established with the permission of the Russian authorities on 22 December 1907 for the establishment of a Polish library by "Oświata" in Minsk. This facility was officially opened on 4 May 1908. At the time of its launch, it had 700 books, most of which were donated by Józef Tyszkiewicz from Lahoysk, while the rest were purchased from the bookstore of Wacław Leon Makowski. Despite giving permission for the opening of this facility, the Russian authorities consistently rejected similar requests from provincial branches of the society. For example, on 14 October 1908, a request from the Pinsk branch was rejected. In 1915, the Minsk library was located in the rectory of the Church of Saints Simon and Helena. It was initiated by Jadwiga Kostrowicka.
- The financial section was responsible for collecting funds for the society's activities and educational work. Membership fees were collected, but they were not enough to meet the needs. Polish education faced constant financial problems, often relying on a foundation of debts and hopes. With the aim of acquiring other sources of funding, concerts, lectures, annual balls were organized, which were popular and brought significant income. "Oświata" was also supported by donors. Significant donations for its activities were made by, among others: Father Kazimierz Mikołaj Michalkiewicz, Wilhelm Jelski, Marian Obiezierski, and Konstanty Prószyński from Ustronie. The society announced its budgetary data, including expenditure data, for the needs of the authorities, but the values provided were often fictitious because the management concealed funds spent on secret Polish schools.

== Pogoń magazine project ==
On 17 October 1907, the Polish Society "Oświata" presented a project for the publication of a Polish magazine titled Pogoń in Minsk. The intention was for it to be a weekly publication featuring texts on religion, history, social and political matters, literature, and specialized topics. The request for permission to publish it was made to the authorities by Włodzimierz Dworzaczek, the former editor-in-chief of the Kyiv weekly Kresy, with the support of the society. On 18 January 1908, the Russian authorities responded positively. The idea generated significant interest among the Polish community. Discussions were held, including in the pages of the Vilnius Polish press, regarding the nature of the future publication. There were debates about whether Pogoń should be a daily or a weekly for the people. Ultimately, although the magazine project was well thought out, it was not realized. It was not possible to gather the required number of 4,000 subscribers, which would guarantee the cost recovery of the publication.

== Working conditions of teachers ==
The Polish Society "Oświata" oversaw a network of illegal Polish schools. Graduates of the teacher training seminars run by the society were directed to work in these schools. The conditions of their work were harsh. They received symbolic remuneration, barely enough to survive, and it was often withheld during the summer break. This was particularly problematic in rural areas, where due to agricultural work, the school year lasted from October 1 to April 1, or sometimes even shorter. Often, the main factor determining the continuation of educational work was the gratitude and attachment of the children.

== Attitude of the population ==
The attitude of the indigenous population of the Minsk Governorate towards the educational activities of the Polish Society "Oświata" was generally positive. Parents willingly sent their children to learn in illegal Polish schools, despite the risk of punishment if the practice was discovered by the Russian police. Occasionally, there were cases of reporting rural teachers to the authorities. Sometimes, even Catholic priests and landowners, traditionally associated with Polish culture in these lands, were involved in such reports. They were likely motivated by fear of repression or enlightenment among the lower social classes, which landowners might have perceived as unfavorable to their interests. However, these were isolated cases. Sometimes, peasants justified sending their children to Polish schools because that's what the landlord wanted.

Some Russian organizations, including members of the so-called Black Hundreds, protested against the development of Polish education. From 28 to 31 August 1908 in Minsk, a congress of the "Orthodox Brotherhood" took place, where a resolution was adopted demanding stricter punishment for clandestine teaching. Negative opinions were also expressed in the Russian press.

== Attitude of Russian authorities ==
From its founding in 1905 until its registration in 1907, the Polish Society "Oświata" operated clandestinely and illegally. Its activities were monitored by the Russian authorities and opposed, although not very intensively. In January 1907, the society was legalized. However, this did not mean that efforts to strengthen Polish identity would be tolerated. The authorities believed that such efforts hindered the assimilation of the Polish element by the Russian and, in various ways, obstructed the activities of "Oświata" and similar organizations in the western part of the Russian Empire. Continuous and detailed inspections were conducted to find any violations of the statutes, which could serve as grounds for its closure. In the spring of 1909, the governor of Minsk assessed that closing "Oświata" would be difficult because it did not violate the law, and its members generally did not establish schools or officially finance them.

In 1909, the chief of police of Mozyrsky Uyezd issued a report stating that the local branch of the Society "Oświata" was illegally operating five schools there. This served as the basis for the organization's disbandment. Consequently, and also because the Russian authorities had previously disbanded similar organizations in Kyiv and Vilnius, the general assembly of the Minsk "Oświata" on 5 December 1909 decided to self-dissolve the organization. In reality, the society returned to clandestine activities.

From 1909 onwards, there was a significant intensification of the fight against illegal Polish education. These actions proved effective and led to the restriction of the Polish educational network. To reduce the risk of discovering clandestine schools, in 1911, the leadership of "Oświata" instructed that secret classes should consist of no more than four children. This significantly reduced the number of students but also led to the creation of more clandestine schools and increased involvement in Polish education among the Minsk bourgeoisie.

== Termination of operations ==
Under the increasing pressure from the Russian authorities, the activities of "Oświata" gradually dwindled. As late as October 1911, the police received reports that Mieczysław Porowski and Father Kazimierz Bukraba were organizing illegal Polish education in Minsk. Illegal gatherings of Polish teachers were also organized every year. The situation only changed in 1917. The liberalization of education following the February Revolution allowed for the resumption of legal activities in this field. On April 20 (May 3), 1917, the Polish Educational Society of the Minsk Region was established, with its board including creators and leading activists of the former "Oświata," such as Mieczysław Porowski, Michalina Łęska, and Zygmunt Węcławowicz.

== Bibliography ==
- Romer, Eugeniusz (1920). Zeszyt VII. Spis ludności na terenach administrowanych przez Zarząd Cywilny Ziem Wschodnich (grudzień 1919). Prace geograficzne wydawane przez Eugenjusza Romera (in Polish). Lviv, Warsaw: Książnica Polska Towarzystwa Nauk Szkół Wyższych.
- Smalanaczuk, Alaksandr (2001). Pamiż krajowasciu i nacyjanalnaj idejaj. Polski ruch na biełaruskich i litouskich ziemlach. 1864−1917 h (in Belarusian). Grodno: Yanka Kupala State University of Grodno.
- Tarasiuk, Dariusz (2007). Między nadzieją a niepokojem. Działalność społeczno-kulturalna i polityczna Polaków na wschodniej Białorusi w latach 1905–1918 (in Polish). Lublin: Wydawnictwo Uniwersytetu Marii Curie-Skłodowskiej. ISBN 978-83-227-2629-7.
- Chmielewska, Gizela (2011). Cierń Kresowy. Opowieść o Edwardzie Woyniłłowiczu i jego rodzinie (in Polish). Łomianki: Wydawnictwo LTW. ISBN 978-83-7565-128-7.
