= Helena Janina Pajzderska =

Polish writer and women's rights activist

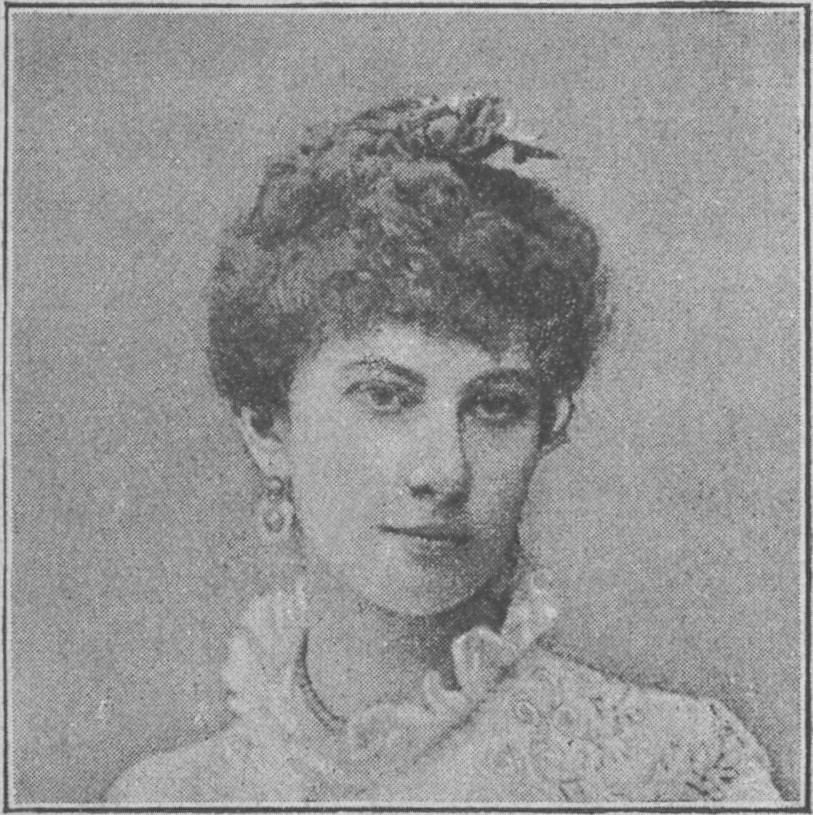
- Born: Helena Janina Boguska; 16 May 1862; Sandomierz
- Died: 4 December 1927 (aged 65); Warsaw
- Writing career
- Pen name: Hajota

Helena Janina Pajzderska née Boguska, also known as Szolc-Rogozińska (1862–1927), was a Polish writer, literary translator, traveller and a women's rights activist. She wrote a number of novels, travel literature and translations under the pen name Hajota.

== Early life and education ==
Helena Janina Boguska was born on 16 May 1862 in Sandomierz, to Jan Boguski and Emilia née Marczewska. She grew up in Warsaw, where she received thorough private education and mastered various foreign languages at Laura Guérin's school. She became friends with a fellow writer Jadwiga Łuszczewska.

== Career ==
Helena debuted in 1875 with a novel Narcyzy Ewuni; she was thirteen at the time of publishing. Her body of work includes novels, travel literature and poetry. Helena wrote under the pen name "Hajota", sometimes also using a second pseudonym "Lascaro". She wrote for the Polish press, such as the Kurier Warszawski, Czas or Kronika Rodzinna. She also translated a number of literary works by such authors as Lord Byron, H. G. Wells, Honoré de Balzac, Victor Hugo, Joseph Conrad and Vicente Blasco Ibáñez.

Thanks to her acquaintance with Bolesław Prus, Helena met Stefan Szolc-Rogoziński, whom she married in 1888 and took on his surname. The couple travelled together to Africa. While they settled on the island of Bioko, where they ran a cocoa plantation, the Rogozińskis also made trips to the main land (e.g. Nigeria, Cameroon) to collect material for their writing and research on native population. Helena was the first Polish woman known to climb Pico Basilé, the tallest peak of Bioko. She may have also been the first European woman documented to do so. In 1891, the couple returned to Europe, where they first gave a couple of scientific lectures in Spain, then made their way back to the Polish territories. The readings secured Helena a membership in the Geographic Society of Madrid and the African Society of Naples.

In 1900, Helena started engaging in women's rights activism. Seven years later, she coordinated the work of two committees (law and politics, literature and arts) at the first Polish Women's Conference.

== Private life and death ==
Helena was married twice. First, to the traveller Stefan Szolc-Rogoziński, whom she married in 1888 and divorced in 1895. In 1904, she married the architect Tomasz Pajzderski, but the marriage was short-lived.

Helena died on 4 December 1927, in Warsaw. She is buried at the Powązki Cemetery.

== Legacy ==
A street in the Warsaw district of Żoliborz bears the name of Hajota – the pen name of Helena Janina Pajzderska.

== Selected works ==
=== Short story collections ===
- Z dalekich lądów

=== Novels ===
- Ostatnia butelka
- Błędne koło
- W pogoni
- Dar Heliogabala
- Wyżebrana godzina
- Rosa Nieves
