= Stefan Szolc-Rogoziński =

Polish explorer (1861–1896)

Stefan Szolc-Rogozinski
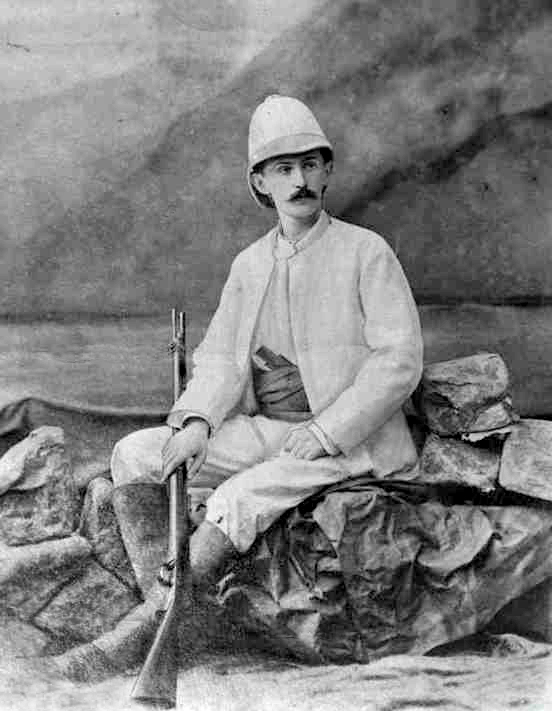
- Born: 14 April 1861; Kalisz, Congress Poland, Russian Empire
- Died: 1 December 1896 (aged 35); Paris, France
- Occupation: Explorer
- Spouse: Helena Janina Pajzderska
- Parents: Ludwik August Adolf Scholtz (father); Malwina Rogozińska (mother)

Stefan Szolc-Rogoziński (14 April 1861 - 1 December 1896) was a Polish explorer of Africa. He was planning to create a Polish colony in Cameroon.

Rogoziński was born in Kalisz in the Russian partition of Poland. After a career in the Imperial Russian Navy, he organised an expedition to Africa with Klemens Tomczek and Leopold Janikowski. His expedition in Cameroon lasted from 1882 to 1884. Rogoziński was commissioned by the British government to act as an agent in the African interior. He had accepted in part because relations between him and local Baptist missionaries had broken down over his decision to sell alcohol to the locals. The missionaries had given him the nickname 'Rogue Gin and Whiskey'. The German press was extremely angry at a Russian citizen being employed by the British to frustrate their imperial ambitions in Cameroon, and Rogoziński's hatred of Germany was well known. Chancellor Otto von Bismarck even made specific reference to the explorer in the Reichstag while complaining about Anglo-German relations. German anger and diplomatic pressure caused by the lead up to the Berlin Conference in 1885, led to the British dismissing Rogoziński from their service. They refused to use the many treaties he had negotiated to press claims in what had by now become recognised as German Kamerun. After his return, in 1895, he joined the Royal Geographical Society. In 1892-1893 he organised an expedition to Egypt.

He founded the National Ethnographic Museum in Warsaw (Państwowe Muzeum Etnograficzne w Warszawie) and donated his collection of items and artefacts to the museum.

Szolc-Rogoziński was married to the writer Helena Janina Pajzderska, with whom he spend a couple of years in Africa.

He died in 1896 in a traffic accident in Paris.
