= Tomasz Pajzderski =

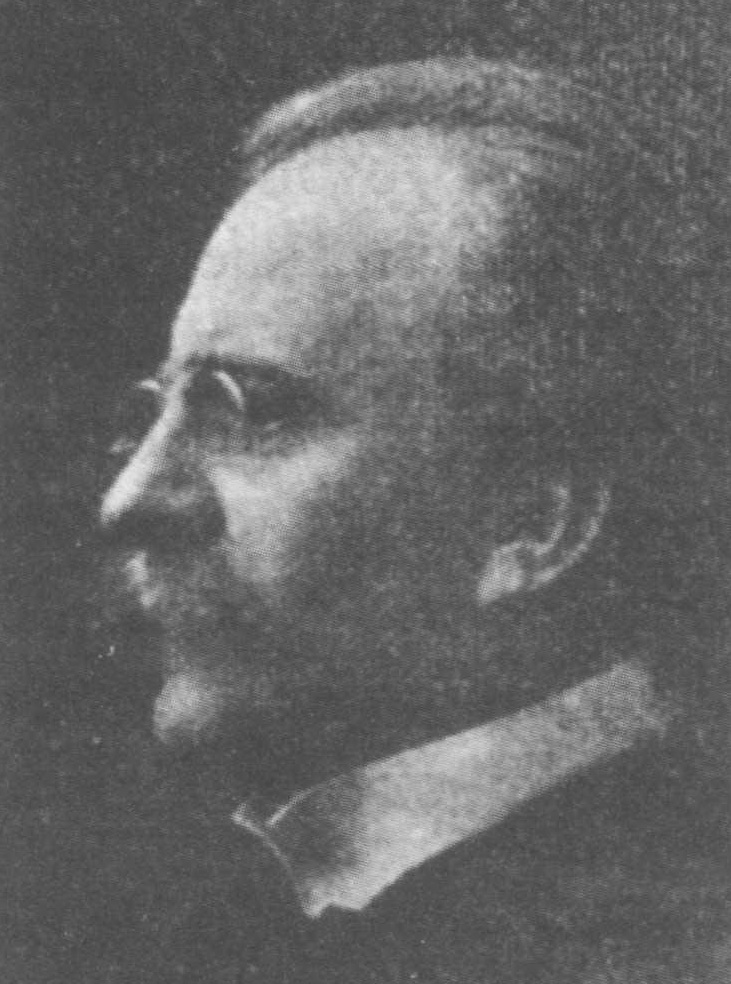
Tomasz Pajzderski

Tomasz Pajzderski (16 February 1864 – 20 November 1908) was a Prussian-Polish historicist architect.

Pajzderski was born in Jeżewo near Gostyń (then in Prussia, now in Poland). He completed gymnasium in Śrem and studied at Charlottenburg Polytechnic and École des Beaux-Arts. In 1895 he entered the Ministry of Public Works in Berlin, where he worked for three years before establishing his own architectural practice. He built tenement buildings (among others on Friedrichstraße) and small palaces in Berlin suburbs. He also designed: the building of the Polish Association of Credit Cooperatives (1897–99, Związek Spółek Zarobkowych) in Posen (Poznań), church in Kapuściany (1899), hotel "Bast" in Inowrocław (1900-1901), churches in Jutrosin (1900-1902, funded by prince Zdzisław Czartoryski), Czeladź and Ostrów.

He moved to Warsaw in 1903 and was admitted professor of applied arts in Warsaw School of Fine Arts (1905-1907).

His further works included: Mikołaj Szelechow's tenement house in Warsaw (1904, with Stanisław Grochowicz), Church of Saints Simon and Helena in Minsk, churches in Lubraniec (1905-1906) and Grabów (built in 1907–1913, destroyed during the Second World War), chappel and manor house in Fajsławice. He also worked on renovation of gothic church in Brześć Kujawski.

He died in Warsaw and was buried at Powązki Cemetery. His brother Sylwester (1876-1953) was also an architect. He was married to the writer Helena Janina Pajzderska.

== Gallery ==
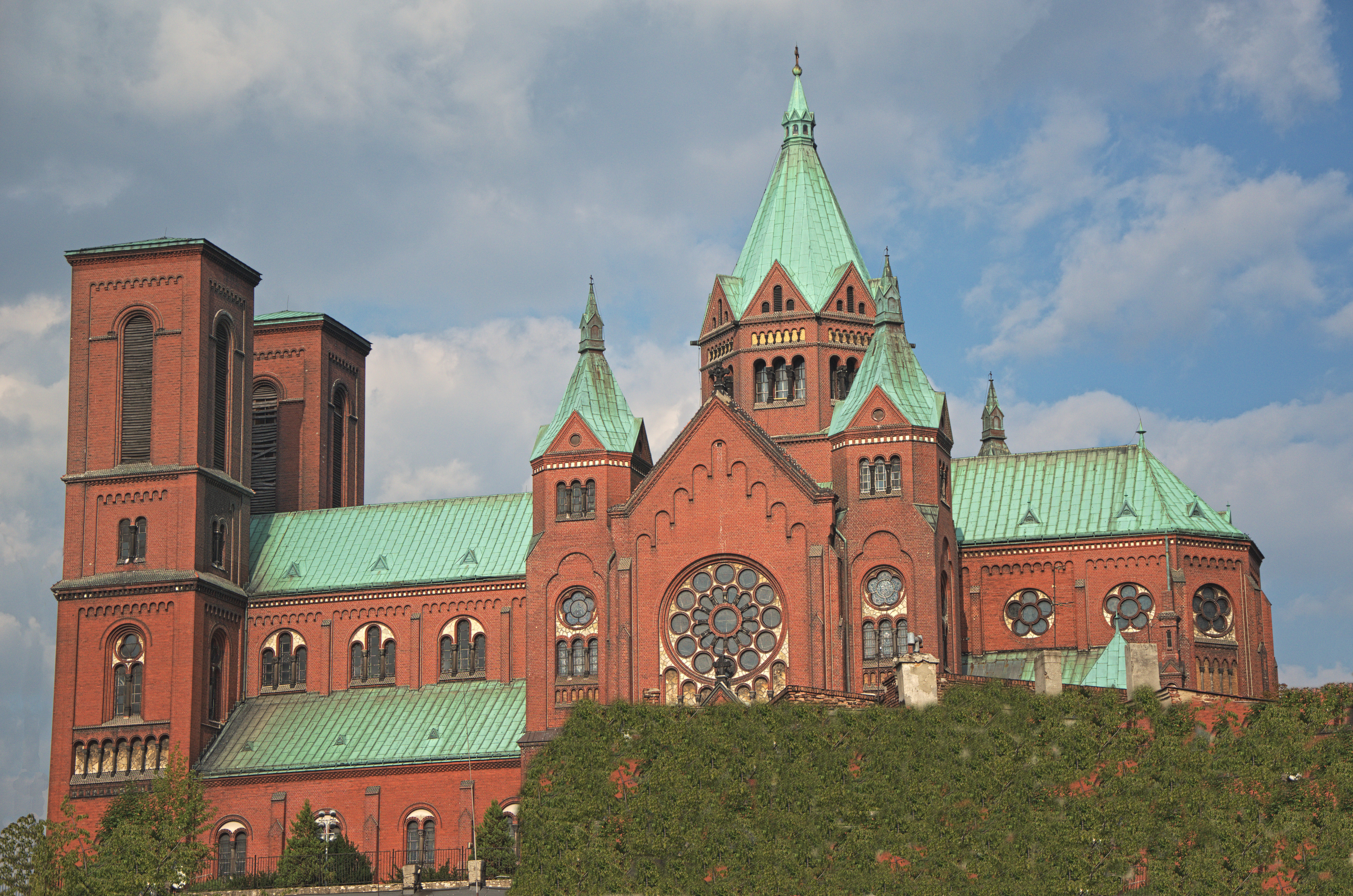
Saint Stanislaus Church in Czeladź

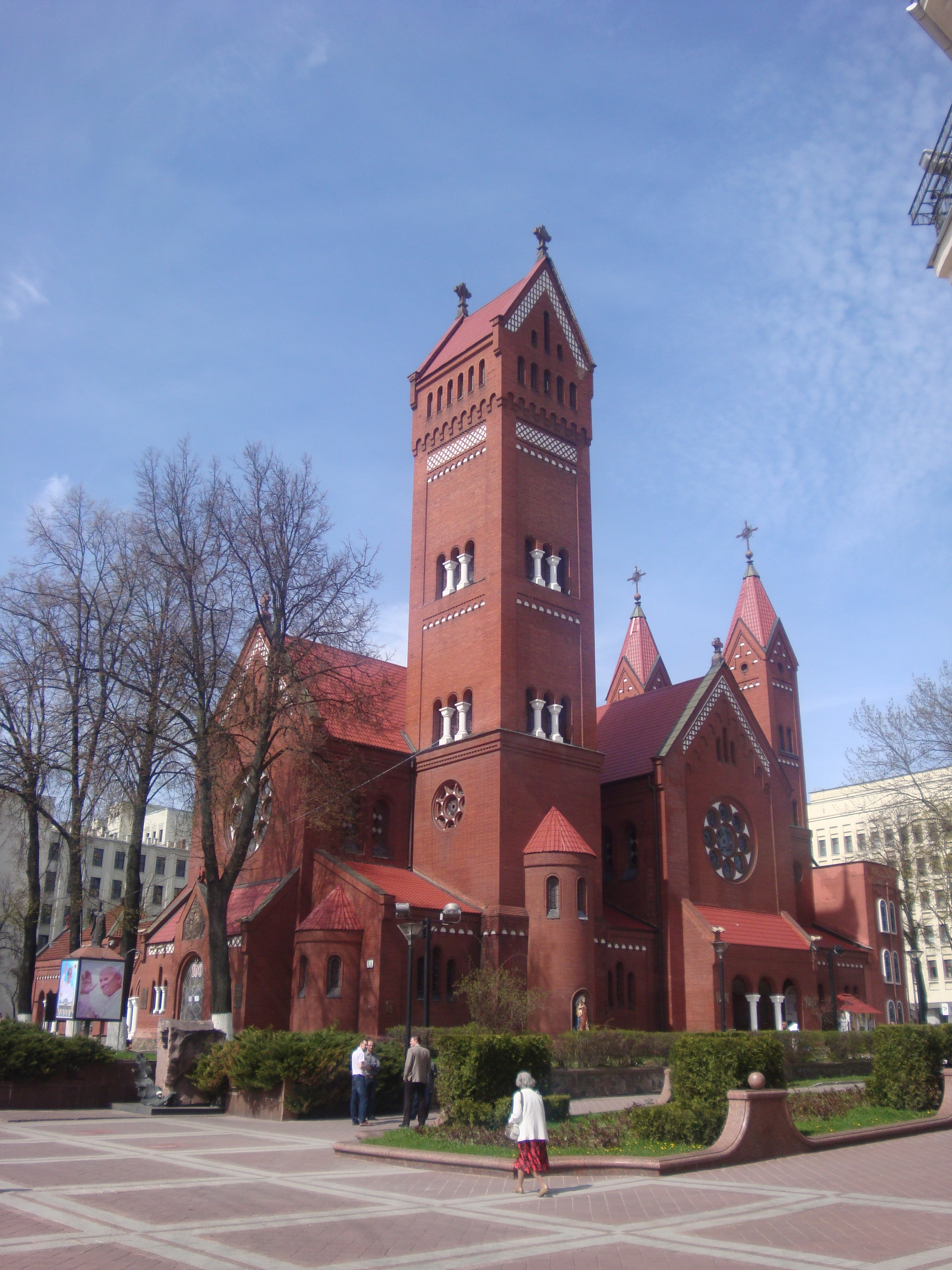
The Red Church in Minsk

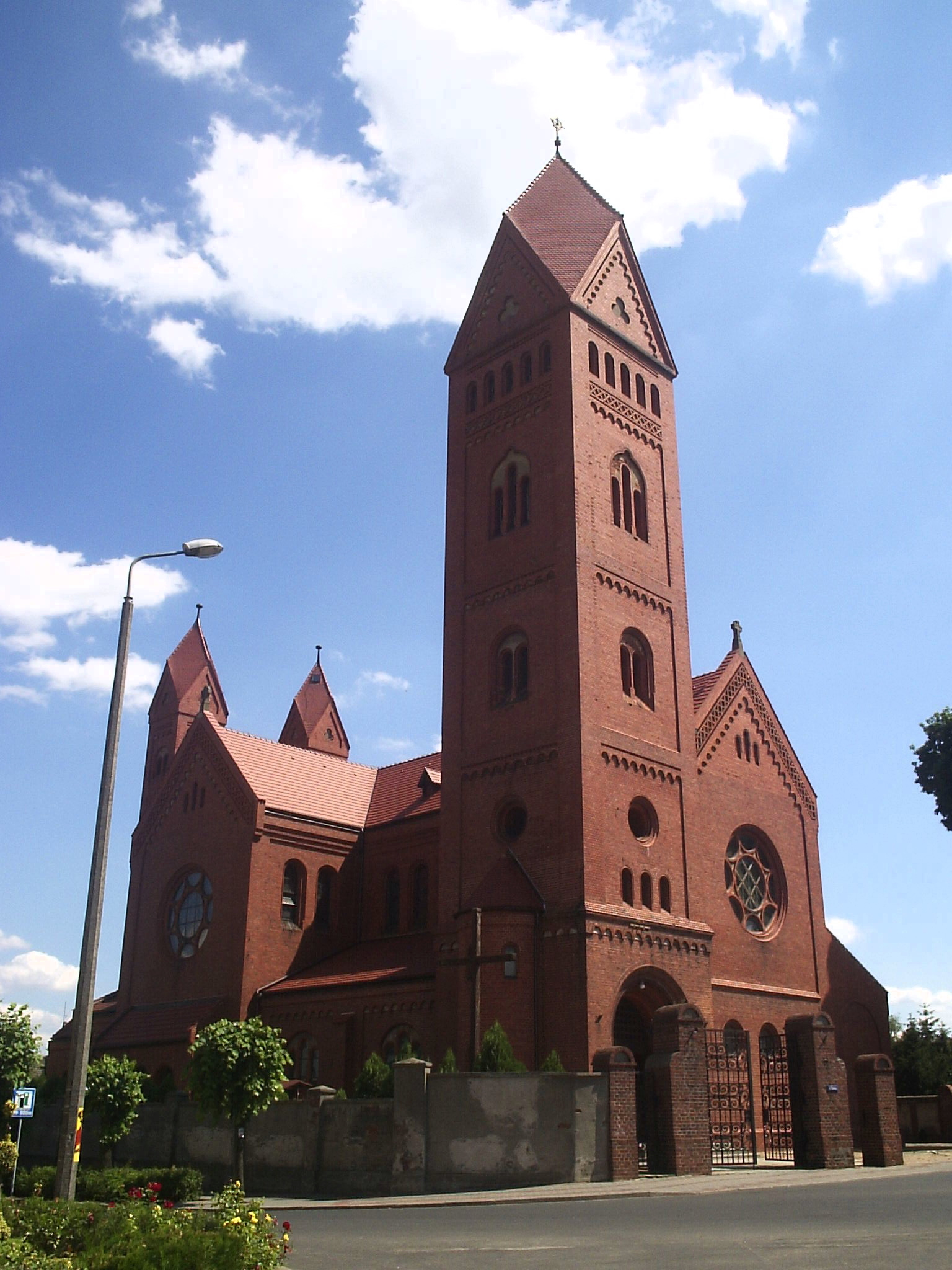
Saint Elisabeth church in Jutrosin

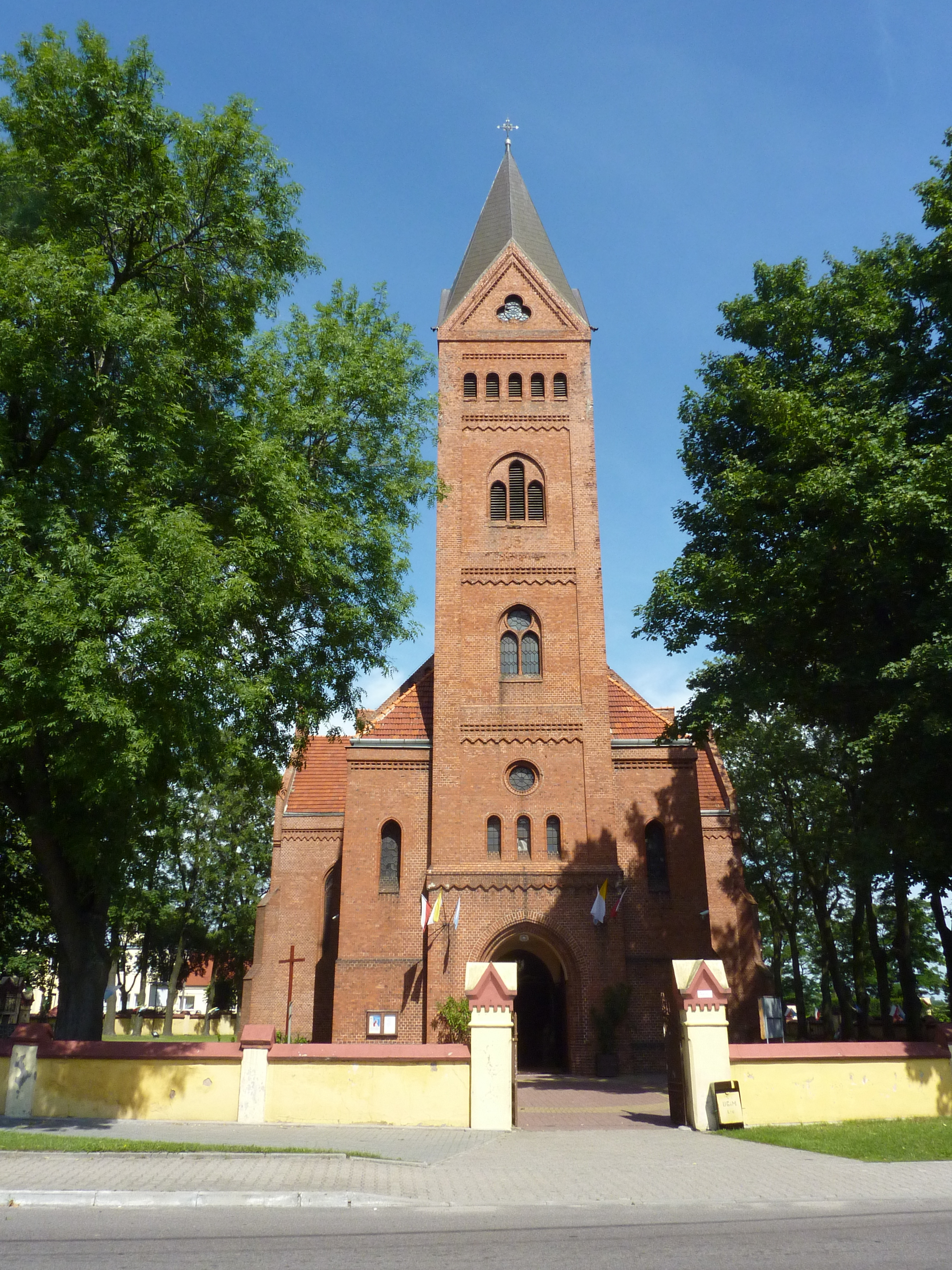
Church of Our Lady of Mt. Carmel in Lubraniec

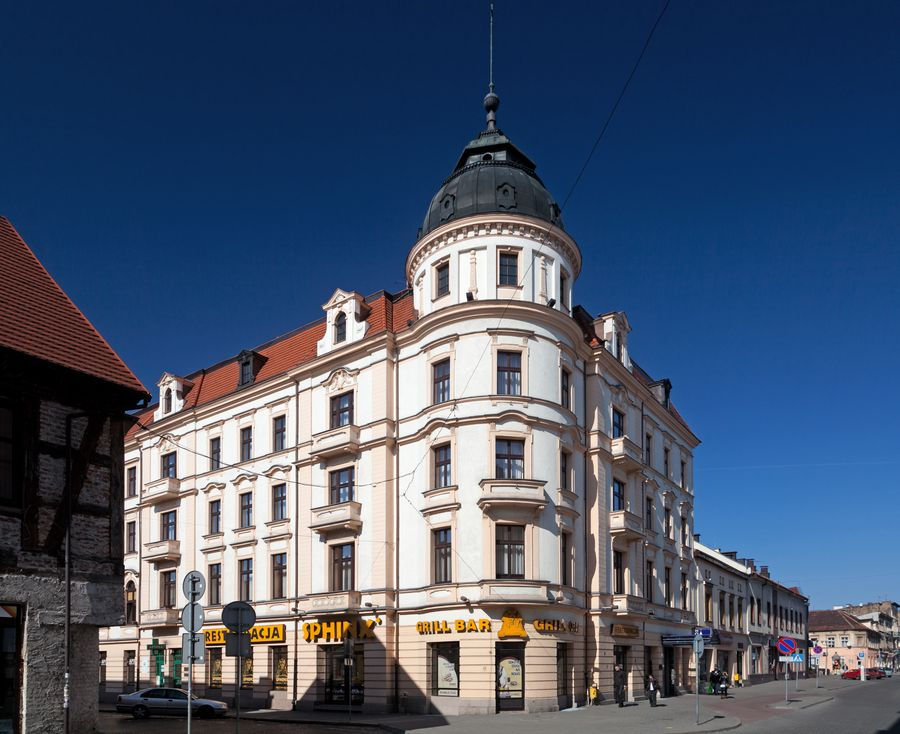
Hotel "Bast" in Inowrocław
