= Vialikaja Sliapianka =

Vialikaja Sliapianka Вялікая Сляпянка (Belarusian)
- Former village
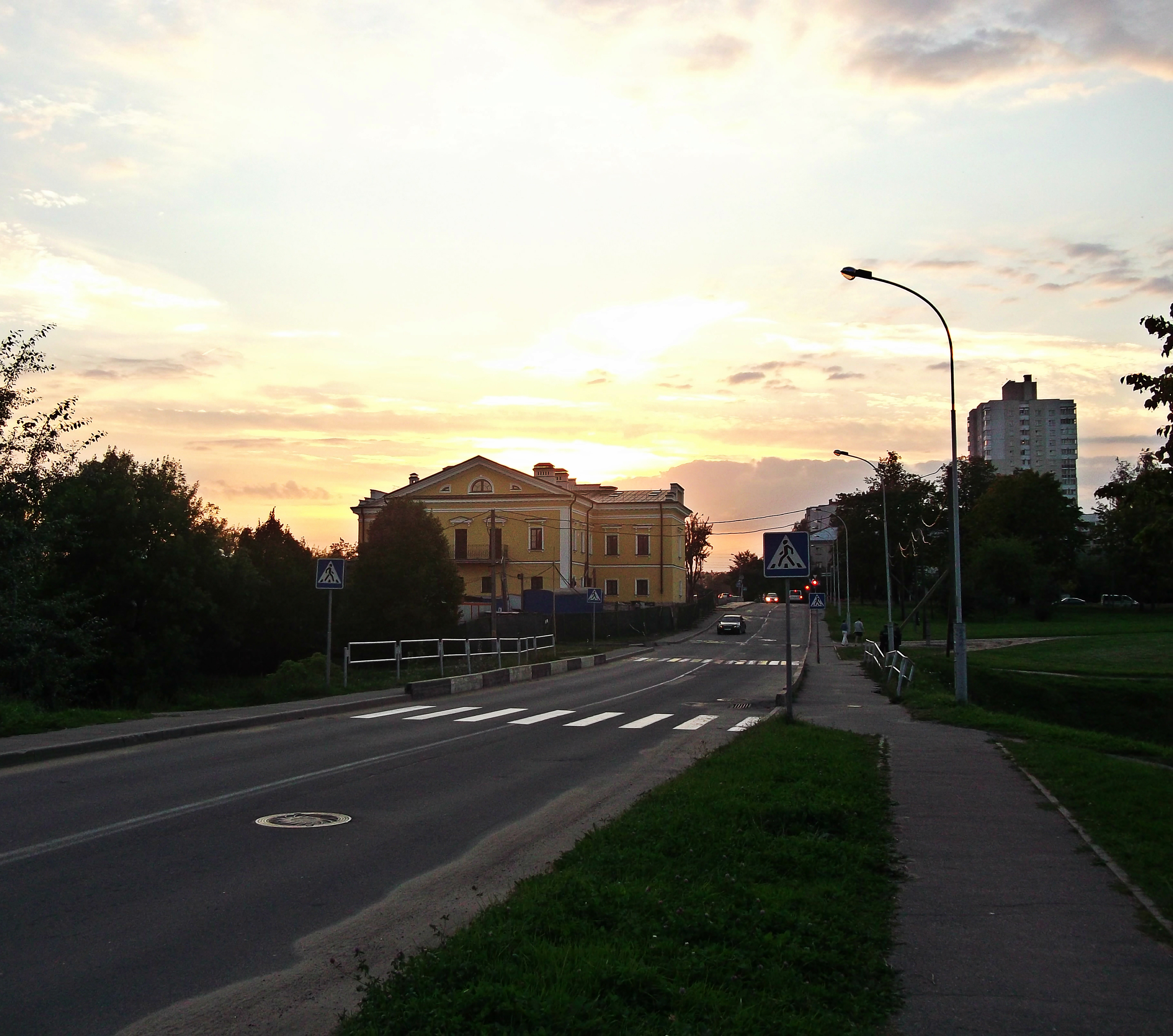
- Vialikaja Sliapianka in 2012
- Interactive map of Vialikaja Sliapianka
- Coordinates: 53°55′11.6″N 27°38′14.5″E
- Country: Belarus
- Region: Minsk Region
- District: Minsk District
- First mentioned: 16th century
- Merged into Minsk: 1959

Vialikaja Sliapianka (Вялі́кая Сляпя́нка) is a former village located on the banks of the Sliepnia River. Since 1959, it has been part of the city of Minsk, Belarus. It is historically known as an estate of the Wańkowicz family, featuring a prominent Wańkowicz manor house built in the Classicist style.

== History ==
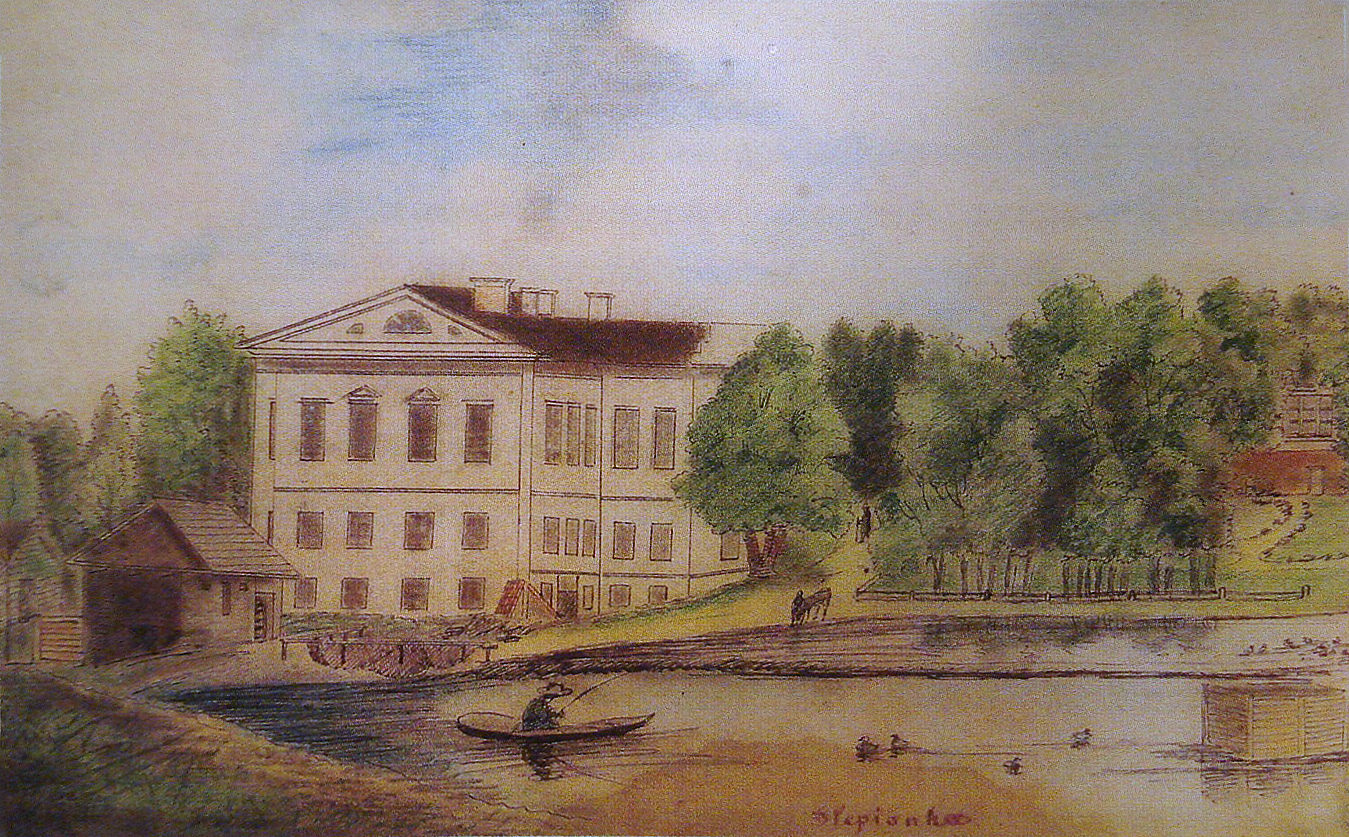
Wańkowicz manor in Vialikaja Sliapianka, painting by Czesław Moniuszko, 1830

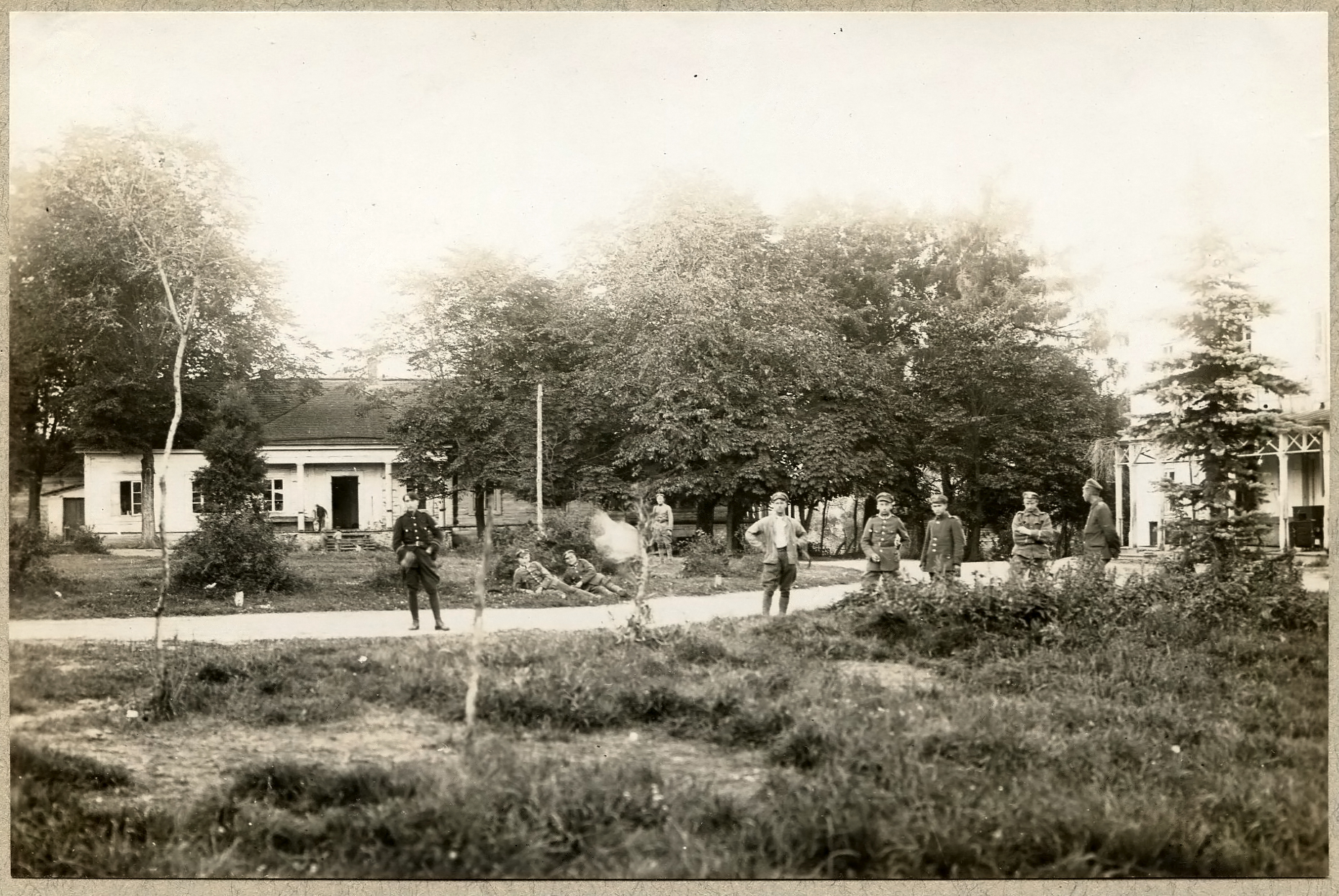
Outbuilding of the manor, 1920

Sliapianka emerged in the 16th century at the intersection of two highways leading to Minsk: the Haradzishchanski and Starabarysauski roads. Until the mid-18th century, the estate belonged to the Radziwiłł family. Later, these lands passed to the Wańkowicz family.

In the second half of the 18th century, Aleksander Wańkowicz divided his extensive holdings between his two sons: Stanisław (died 1812) and Melchior (1775–1842). This division led to the appearance of two distinct settlements on the map of the Minsk District: Vialikaja Sliapianka (Great Sliapianka) and Malaja Sliapianka (Little Sliapianka).

After the death of Stanisław, Vialikaja Sliapianka was inherited by his son, Edward Wańkowicz (1793–1872), a cousin of the painter Walenty Wańkowicz. Following Edward's death, the estate passed to his youngest son, Władysław (1839–1888), and was later inherited by Edward's eldest brother, Zygmunt (1820–1891). Zygmunt's son, Piotr Wańkowicz (1866–1936), became the last owner of Vialikaja Sliapianka.

The estate is also notable as the birthplace of Edward Woyniłłowicz, a prominent Belarusian political and civic leader, whose mother often stayed at her parents' estate.

In 1917, the settlement was part of the Sienica volost of the Minsk District. It had 192 inhabitants. Nearby were the village of Sliapianka (3 households, 11 inhabitants), the Sliapianka tract, a khutor (farmstead), and a distillery, all of which later merged into a single village.

During the Soviet era, the property was nationalized. In the 1930s, the "Bolshevik" collective farm was established. The existing greenhouse facility was transformed into the Budyonny vegetable-growing state farm. The Wańkowicz manor initially housed a school for junior officers of the NKVD, and later served as the headquarters of a central potato research station. Administratively, it was part of the Sliapianka rural council (Selsoviet) of the Minsk District.

In 1959, Vialikaja Sliapianka was incorporated into the city limits of Minsk, becoming part of the Pyershamayski and Partyzanski districts. The village buildings were eventually demolished. Today, the area corresponds to Parnikovaya Street and Parnikovy Lane, intersected from south to north by Filimonava Street. A low-rise residential neighborhood named Vialikaja Sliapianka is located here. The historic Wańkowicz manor has been preserved.

== Landmarks ==
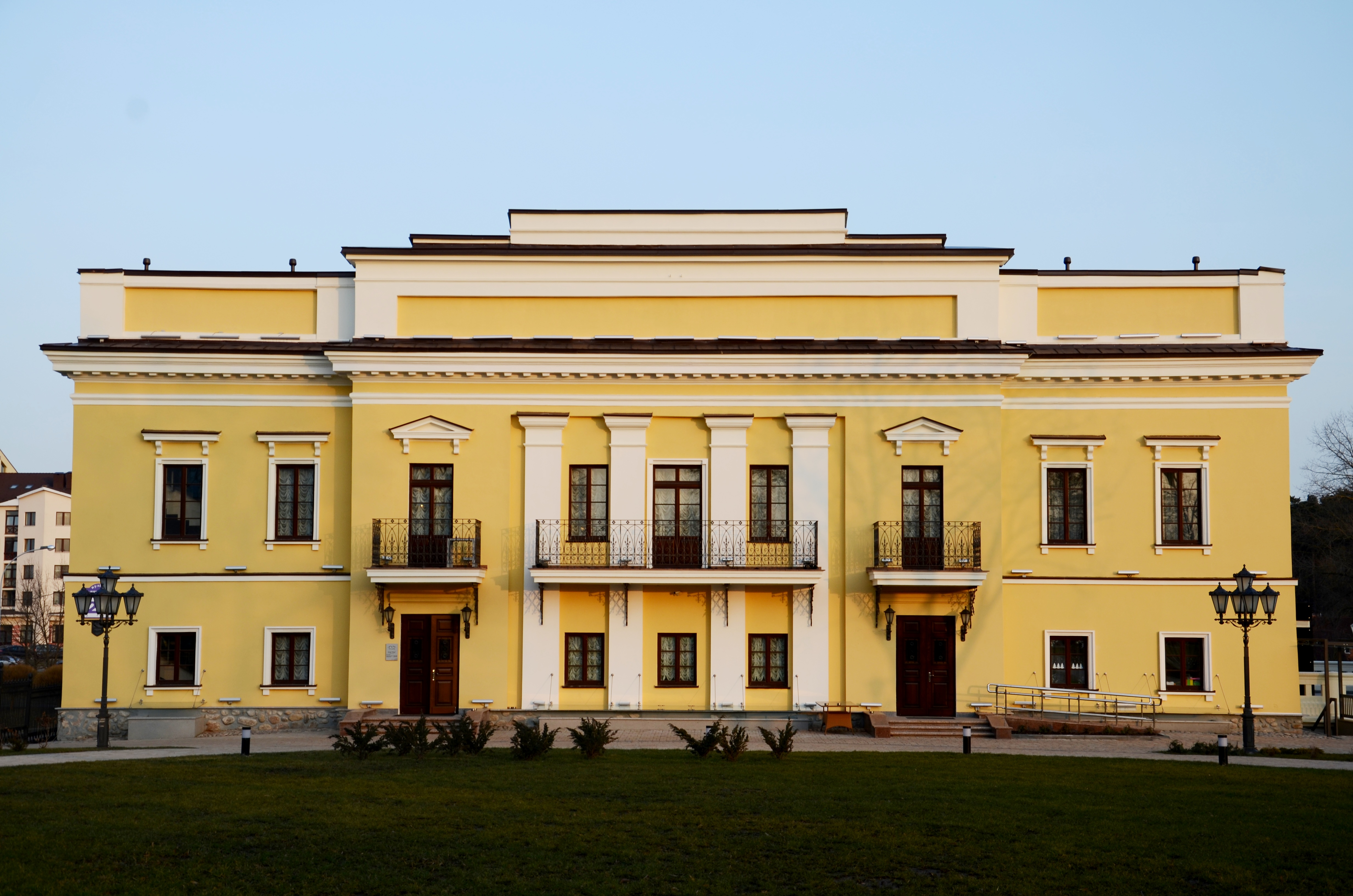
Wańkowicz manor house, 2013

- Wańkowicz Manor, built in the first half of the 19th century.

== See also ==
- Malaja Sliapianka
- Sliapianka Cemetery
- Expansion of Minsk
