= Edward Tarletski =

Belarusian activist & drag entertainer (born 1969)

- Эдвард Тарлецкі
- Born: Edward Zinowevich Tarletski; Эдвард Зіноўевіч Тарлецкі; 5 February 1969 (age 57); Minsk, Byelorussian SSR, Soviet Union
- Other names: Norma Pospolita; Madame Zhu-Zhu (Мадам Жу Жу)
- Occupations: Drag performer, musician, journalist
- Years active: 1990–present
- Website: travesti-diva.io.ua

Edward Zinowevich Tarletski (Belarusian: Эдвард Зіноўевіч Тарлецкі; born 5 February 1969), also known by the stage names Norma Pospolita and Madame Zhu-Zhu (Мадам Жу Жу) is a Belarusian drag performer, recording artist, entertainer, journalist, gay activist, and costume designer, living in Stockholm, Sweden. He was born in Minsk, Belarus on 5 February 1969. Edward Tarletski graduated as a photographer and a journalist in European Humanities University (Minsk) in 1996. Since 2000, he has been a member of the Belarusian Association of Journalists.

== Life in Belarus ==
In 1990, Tarletski was one of two people who hunger striked for returning the Church of Saints Simon and Helena building to the Catholic community in Minsk.

Between 1993 and 1998, Tarletski worked as a journalist for the Radio Free Europe/Radio Liberty and as an editor of youth programming at the Belarusian state television station; at the same time he published articles in the Belarusian Catholic magazine "Nasha vera" (Our faith).

Edward Tarletski was the first Belarusian person to publicly come out in 1998. In the same year, he founded BELARUS LAMBDA LEAGUE, the first LGBT organization in Belarus.

On 19 April 1999, Tarletski organized the first ever gay public action in Belarus, when LGBT rights activists demonstrated to protest the authorities' refusal to register their organization. Edward Tarletski told RFE/RL that the Belarusian authorities are guided by Soviet stereotypes in their unwillingness to recognize the existence of a "non-traditional sexual orientation" in Belarus. Tarletski added that the demonstrators also wanted to protest a recent seminar organized by the Belarusian Exarchate of the Russian Orthodox Church at which some participants called homosexuals "servants of the devil" and proposed punishing them by electrocution.

Two years later, during the action "Gays against Fascism", which took place on 3 July 2001 in the memorial complex to victims of Holocaust "Yama" in Minsk, Traletski stated:

Fascism does not need to have a uniform to be noticed straight away. Fascism is a way of thinking and a lifestyle. Unfortunately, a number of people in our country are subject to this evil. We lay our rainbow flag at the monument to victims of Holocaust as a symbol of hope that sometime in the future this country will put an end to fascism.

At the public action "Gays against fascism" which was held at memorial "Maly Trostenets extermination camp" during the Belarus Gay Pride in Minsk on 5 September 5, 2001, Edward Tarletski said:

In Belarus, we have a special attitude to the problem of Nazism, because even by the estimates of Soviet historians, which are usually lowered, about 25% of Belarusians were murdered by fascists during the Second World War. Also underlined that the nazi persecution of homosexuals mostly was silenced in Belarus from Soviet times till now [...] we need to do a lot of work to reveal the names of this heroes and obstacles of their death and hope that holding the actions like this will initiate Belarusian LGBT movement activists to work more hard for it.

In 1998–2005, Tarletski published and edited Belarusian LGBT magazines FORUM LAMBDA and TABOO.

Between 1999 and 2002, Edward Tarletski held the position of Chairman of the Organizing Committee of Belarus Gay Pride (Minsk Pride) festivals.

Edward Tarletski, Chair of Forum Lambda, is the best known national figure – a leader inspired by the U.S. Gay Movement. He irritates the hell out of many and is detested in some community groups, but there are others who are committed to his cause. The Belarus opposition to President Aleksandr Lukasjenka washes its hands when he turns up at its side. The opposition finds it difficult to give prominence to homosexuals in its programmes and activities. Nevertheless, in a society where homosexuality was forbidden up to 1994, the trend has changed dramatically

— Maria Söderberg, REALITY COUNTS. Focusing on Sexuality and Rights in the Fight against HIV/AIDS. (Stockholm, October 2004 ISBN 91-85188-33-6)

In 2005, Edward Tarletski started his career as a drag entertainer in the LGBT club named Babylon in Minsk, Belarus.

== Life in Ukraine ==
Being politically persecuted in Belarus, Tarletski moved to Ukraine in 2008, when he played the role of DIVA in the cult Russian movie Chapiteau-Show which won the prize of the XXXIII Moscow Film Festival. After that, Edward Tarletski focused on a career as a drag entertainer and later, he founded the famous Ukrainian drag queen contest ″MISS DIVA″ in 2013. In February 2014, Edward Tarletski as Madame Zhu-Zhu took part in TV show "Zvana Vecherya" (Ukrainian version of the My Kitchen Rules), episodes 46–50 Being a popular artist in night clubs of Ukraine, in 2015, Tarletski has participated as a drag performer in the music video ″WINGS″ Surrender album of the British duo Hurts. 2015 he applied for political asylum in Ukraine, but his demand was refused. In 2018 he moved to Sweden.

== Life in Sweden ==
Since 2018 Tarletski has lived in Stockholm, Sweden, where he participates in the protest movement against the government of Alexander Lukashenko.

== Filmography ==
Title	Year	Role	Notes
Chapiteau-Show	2011	Diva	Director: Sergey Loban Writer: Marina Potapova

=== Television credits ===
Title	Year	Role	Notes
Zvana Vecherya episodes 46–50	2014	Madame Zhu-Zhu	Produced for STB.
