= Edward Woyniłłowicz =

Belarusian public and political figure

- Эдвард Вайніловіч
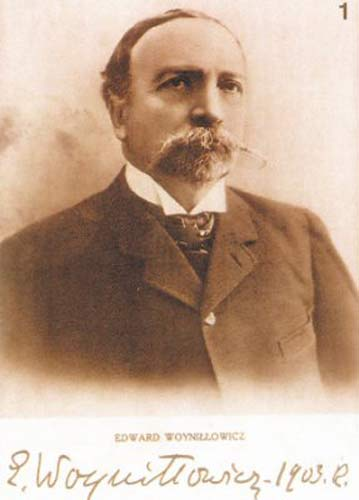
- Born: October 13, 1847; Slepianka near Minsk
- Died: June 16, 1928 (aged 80); Bydgoszcz, Poland
- Resting place: Starofarny Cemetery in Bydgoszcz then near the Church of Saints Simon and Helena, Minsk
- Education: St. Petersburg Practical Technological Institute
- Known for: landowner, entrepreneur, philanthropist, public figure and the funder of the landmark Church of Saints Simon and Helena

Edward Antoni Leonard Woyniłłowicz (Belarusian: Эдвард Вайніловіч, romanized: Edvard Vaynilovich; 13 October 1847 – 16 June 1928) was a Polish-Belarusian landowner, entrepreneur, philanthropist, public figure and the funder of the landmark "Red Church" of St. Simon and St. Helena on Independence Square in Minsk.

== Early years ==
Woyniłłowicz was born into a noble family in the village of Vialikaja Sliapianka near Minsk (now located within the boundaries of Minsk) in the estate of his maternal grandparents.

He received his primary education at home, on his ancestral estate of Savičy (Polish: Sawicze; Slutsk District) and learned Polish, Belarusian, Russian, German and French. Later, he graduated with honours from the Slutsk Calvinist Gymnasium and in 1865 enrolled in the St. Petersburg Practical Technological Institute. After graduation, he did an internship at Dr. Strausberg's locomotive factory in Hanover (Germany), worked for some time in Belgium, travelled in Italy, studied economics and agriculture in France and Prussia. He later worked as an engineer at the Putilov factory in St. Petersburg.

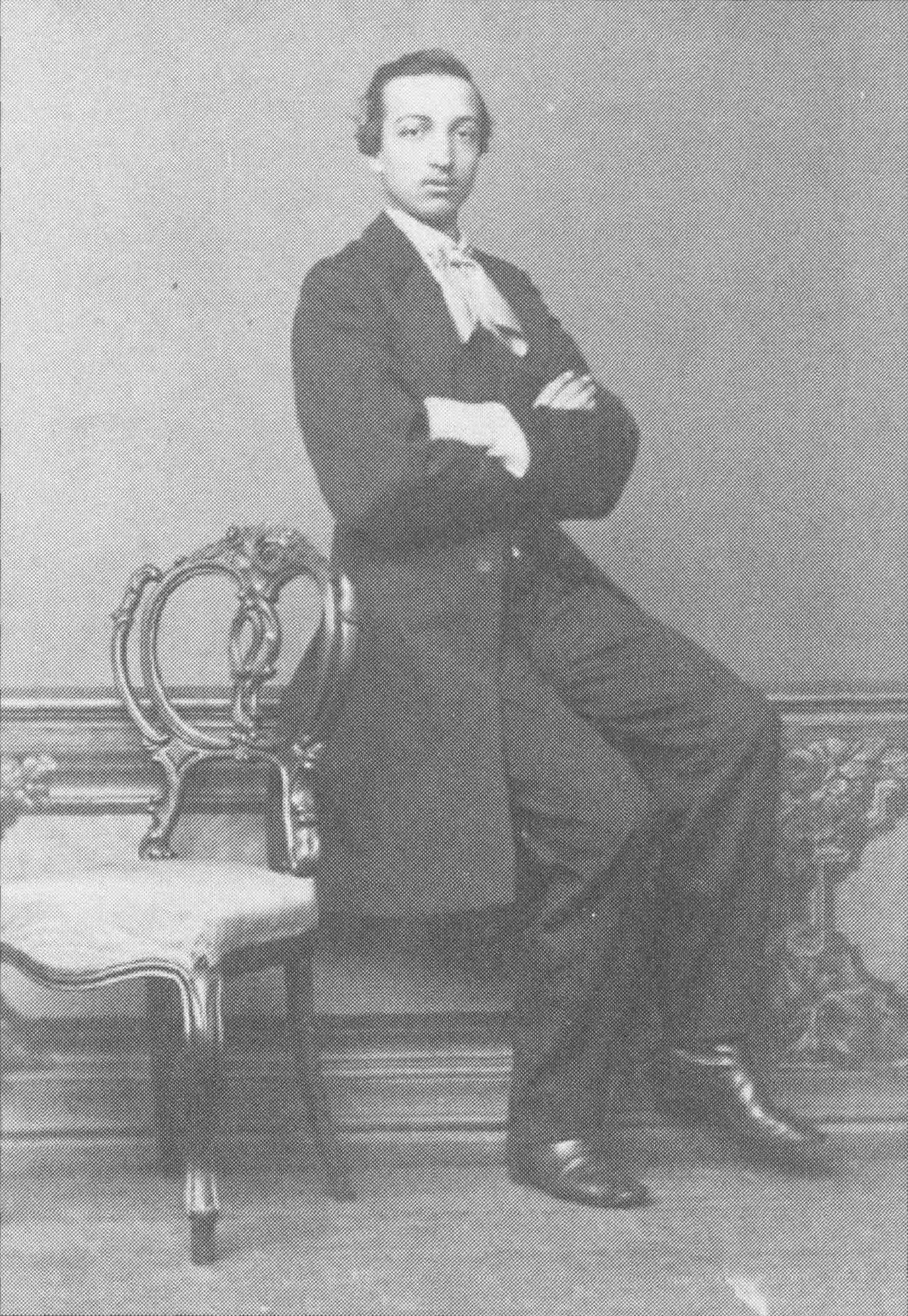
Edward Woyniłłovicz in his youth

== Business activities and state service ==
In 1872, Woyniłłowicz returned to the Savičy estate and engaged in agricultural production. He employed progressive economic methods and is credited with "a first-class system of land management". He devoted a lot of time to work in the Minsk Society of Agriculture, of which he was a member since 1878, and organised agricultural exhibitions.

Woyniłłowicz also joined public and state service. He was an honorary justice of the peace of Slucak district and a Slucak representative at the Minsk Nobility Deputies' Assembly. After the 1905 Russian Revolution he was elected several times to the State Duma of the Russian Empire. In 1906, he became a member of the financial commission of the Imperial State Council where he lobbied agrarian issues.

== Philanthropy ==
In addition to business activities and public service, Woyniłłowicz was actively involved in philanthropy: He became a member of a Slucak district charitable society and financed a number of schools, churches and poverty relief organisations.

After the untimely death of his children, he funded the construction of the Red Church in Minsk dedicated in their memory. The church, which cost Woyniłłowicz 300,000 rubles, was consecrated on 21 November 1910 and remains one of Minsk's landmarks.

Woyniłłowicz sympathised with the Belarusian independence movement and supported it financially, although he had reservations about its socialist ideas and opposed any kind of revolution.

== Later years ==
During World War 1, Woyniłłowicz chaired a mobilisation commission in Slucak district and provided assistance to refugees.

In 1917 he advocated the restoration of the Grand Duchy of Lithuania and supported the idea of an independent Belarus in confederation with Poland. He participated in meetings of the Council of the Belarusian Democratic Republic.

In 1918 the Savičy estate was looted and its windmills, library with 5,000 rare books and a large picture gallery were burned down. The archive of the Woyniłłowicz family, which contained documents dating back over 300 years, was completely destroyed. When the looters were apprehended by the German military authorities and condemned to death, Woyniłłowicz successfully petitioned to commute their sentence.

In July 1920, Woyniłłowicz went into exile with his family and settled in Bydgoszcz (the Second Polish Republic), where he funded a large home for orphans.

The Belarusian congress of Slucak district, which started the Slucak uprising, was held on 14–15 November 1920, in Woyniłłowicz's house in Slucak.

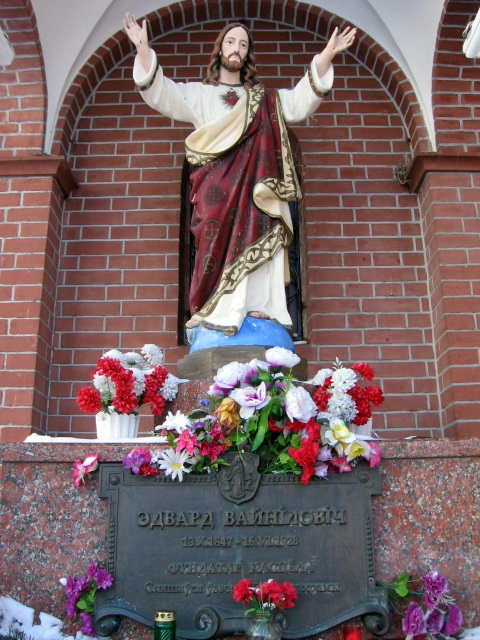
Resting place of Edward Woyniłłovicz

== Death and memory ==
Woyniłłowicz died on 16 June 1928 in Bydgoszcz.

In 2006, his remains were transported to Minsk and buried near the entrance to the Red Church which he funded. The Catholic Church in Belarus started preparing documents for Woyniłłowicz's beatification.

On 6 September 2007, the Minsk local council decided to rename a small street next to the Red Church from the communist leader Berson to Woyniłłowicz. However, the decision was revoked on 30 November that year after protests by local communist activists.
