= Church of Saints Simon and Helena =

Roman Catholic church in Minsk, Belarus

Church of Sts. Simon and Helena
- Касцёл Свсв. Сымона і Алены (Belarusian); Kościół św. Szymona i św. Heleny (Polish)
- The Red Church

Religion
- Affiliation: Roman Catholic
- Year consecrated: 1910

Location
- Location: Minsk
- Country: Belarus
- Interactive map of Church of Sts. Simon and Helena
- Coordinates: 53°53′47.47″N 27°32′50.92″E

Architecture
- Architect: Tomasz Pajzderski
- Type: Church
- Style: Neo-Romanesque
- Completed: 1910
- Materials: Clay bricks

The Church of Saints Simon and Helena (Belarusian: Касьцёл сьвятых Сымона і Алены, romanized: Kaściol śviatych Symona i Alieny; Russian: Костёл Святого Симеона и Святой Елены, romanized: Kostel Svyatogo Simeona i Svyatoy Eleny; Polish: Kościół św. Szymona i św. Heleny w Mińsku), also known as the Red Church (Belarusian: Чырвоны касьцёл; Russian: Красная церковь, romanized: Krasnaya tserkov; Polish: Czerwony Kościół), is a Roman Catholic church on Independence Square in Minsk, Belarus.

This neo-Romanesque church was designed by Polish architects Tomasz Pajzderski and Władysław Marconi. The cornerstone was laid in 1905 and the church was completed in 1910. The bricks for its walls were sourced from Częstochowa, while the roof tiles came from Włocławek. Its construction was financed by Edward Woyniłłowicz (1847–1928), a prominent Belarusian-Polish landowner, businessman and civic activist. The church was named and consecrated in memory of Woyniłłowicz's two deceased children, Szymon and Helena.

After a small fire in part of the church in September 2022, Belarusian authorities banned the parish from continuing to use the church. Officials have rejected all attempts to have it reopened for worship.

== History ==
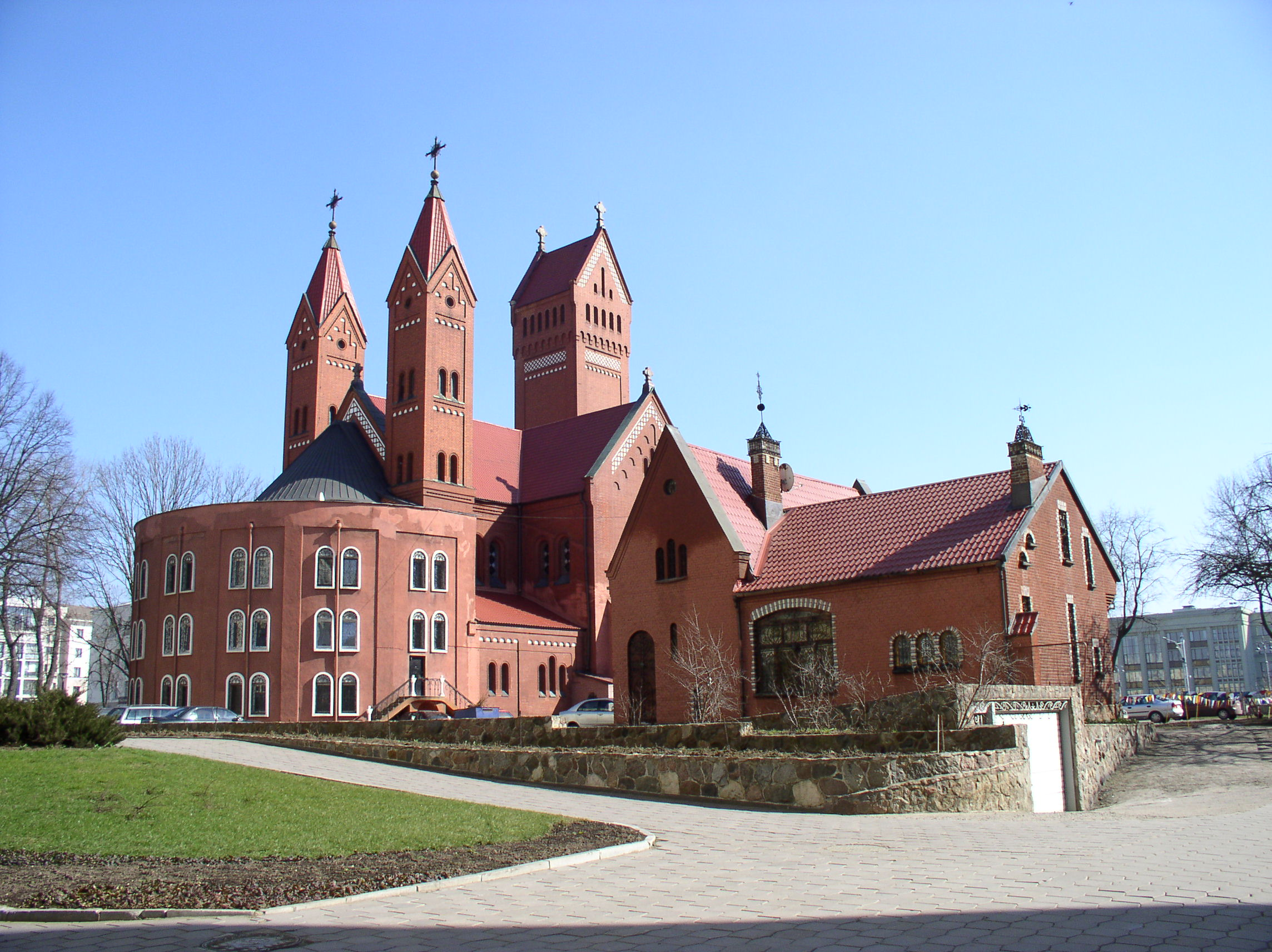
Church of Saint Simon and Helena, 2007

In 1903, about 2,000 of Minsk's Catholics wrote a petition to the local authorities asking for a site to start building a new Catholic church. This request was approved and construction started in 1905. The church was consecrated on 20 September 1910. On 21 December 1910, the church was opened. At this time, Minsk was part of the Minsk Governorate of the Russian Empire.

In 1921, Minsk became the capital of the Belorussian Soviet Socialist Republic (BSSR) within the Soviet Union and the church was sacked by the Red Army. In 1932, it was closed down by the Soviet authorities and was secularised. It was transferred to the State Polish Theatre of the BSSR. It was later used as a cinema. In 1941, during the Second World War, the German occupation administration returned the building to its original use as a church. After the war, it was again closed by the Soviet authorities and again used as a cinema.

In 1990, after two hunger strikes which were organized by the Minsk Catholic activists Anna Nicievska-Sinevicz and Edward Tarletski, the building was returned to the Roman Catholic Church. The church's interior has been fully restored and it is now an important centre of religious, cultural and social life in Minsk. It has also become a centre for the revived Belarusian Greek Catholic Church.

In 2006, the remains of Edward Woyniłłowicz and his wife were reburied in the church. In 1921, Woyniłłowicz, the donor who had the church built, was forced to leave his home and lands in Slutsk, Belarus, due to the territorial changes after the First World War as stipulated in the Peace of Riga. He resettled in Bydgoszcz, Poland where he died in 1928.

In 2019, the Roman Catholic community situated in the church (owned by government) started to get invoices for property tax and land tax despite the tax exemption for religious communities. As of May 2021, the situation was unresolved. On 26 August 2020, during an anti-government demonstration in Independence Square, law enforcers blocked the doors of the church while about 100 people were inside. The auxiliary bishop of the Minsk-Mogilev Catholic Archdiocese, Yuri Kasabutsky, protested against the actions of the police force, describing those as "illegal".

== Notable interments ==
- Edward Woyniłłowicz and his wife
- Guy Picarda (1931–2007), scholar and promoter of Belarusian culture and music
