= Independence Day (Belarus) =

Public holiday in Belarus

Independence Day Дзень Незалежнасці (Belarusian)
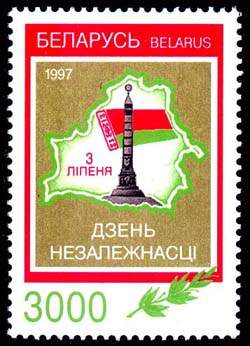
- A 1997 commemorative stamp of Belarus honoring the sixth anniversary of independence
- Observed by: Belarus
- Significance: The day Belarus was liberated from Nazi German occupation
- Celebrations: Fireworks, concerts, parades (Minsk Independence Day Parade)
- Date: 3 July
- Next time: 3 July 2027
- Frequency: Annual

Independence Day of the Republic of Belarus (Belarusian: Дзень Незалежнасці Рэспублікі Беларусь, romanized: Dzień Niezaliežnaści Respubliki Bielaruś, Russian: День Независимости Республики Беларусь), also known as Republic Day or Liberation Day, is a public holiday, the independence day of Belarus and is celebrated each year on 3 July. Independence Day is a non-working day.

== History ==
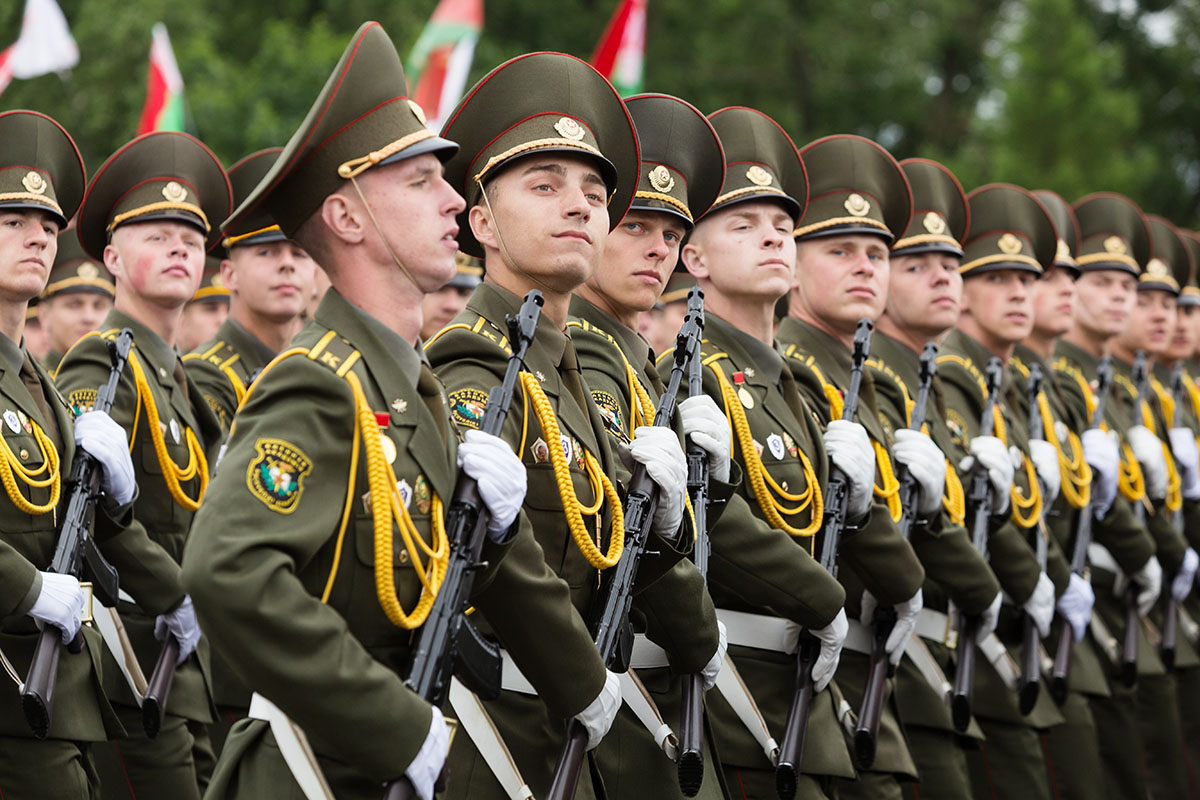
Soldiers on Victors Avenue during a parade in honor of independence day in 2017

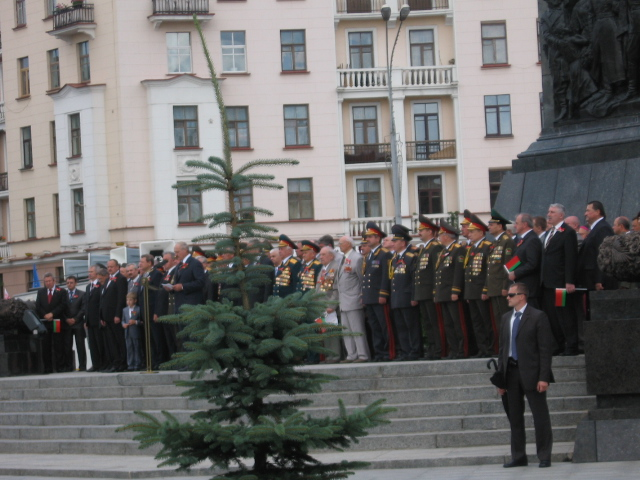
A speech by President of Belarus Alexander Lukashenko during the Independence Day celebrations on Victory Square in 2010

3 July 1944 was the day of Soviet liberation of Minsk from the Wehrmacht during the Minsk Offensive (code-named "Bagration"). The decision to celebrate Independence Day on 3 July, the day of the liberation of Belarus from the Nazis, from 27 July, the day of the Declaration of Sovereignty of Belarus in breaking away from the Soviet Union, was made during a controversial national referendum held in 1996 proposed by President Alexander Lukashenko. Prior to the 1996 change, July 3 was celebrated locally in Minsk as simply Minsk Day.

Since waves of unrest began in Central and Eastern Europe in 1989, particularly in Poland, the countries in those regions sought independence from the Soviet Union. In Belarus, from 1991 to 1995 Independence Day was celebrated on 27 July, the day of the Declaration of Sovereignty of Belarus. This event was Belarus' declaration of independence from the Soviet Union. On 25 August 1991, after the August events in Moscow, the Byelorussian SSR gave the Declaration of Sovereignty of the Republic constitutional status.

On 19 September 1991, the Permanent Representative of the Byelorussian SSR Hienadz Buraukin informed the office of the Secretary General of the United Nations that the country would officially henceforth be known simply as "Belarus".

On 10 December 1991, the Supreme Soviet of Belarus ratified the Belavezha Accords, which formally declared the dissolution of the Soviet Union. Independence was formally received 26 December 1991 in connection with the collapse of the Soviet Union.

== Controversy ==
There is a public debate in Belarus regarding the appropriate date to be considered Independence Day. Since the early 1920s, various Belarusian political movements and the Belarusian diaspora have been celebrating Independence Day on 25 March as the anniversary of the 1918 declaration of independence by the Belarusian Democratic Republic. The date is still widely celebrated by members of the democratic opposition in Belarus and by the Belarusian diaspora as Freedom Day.

== Events ==
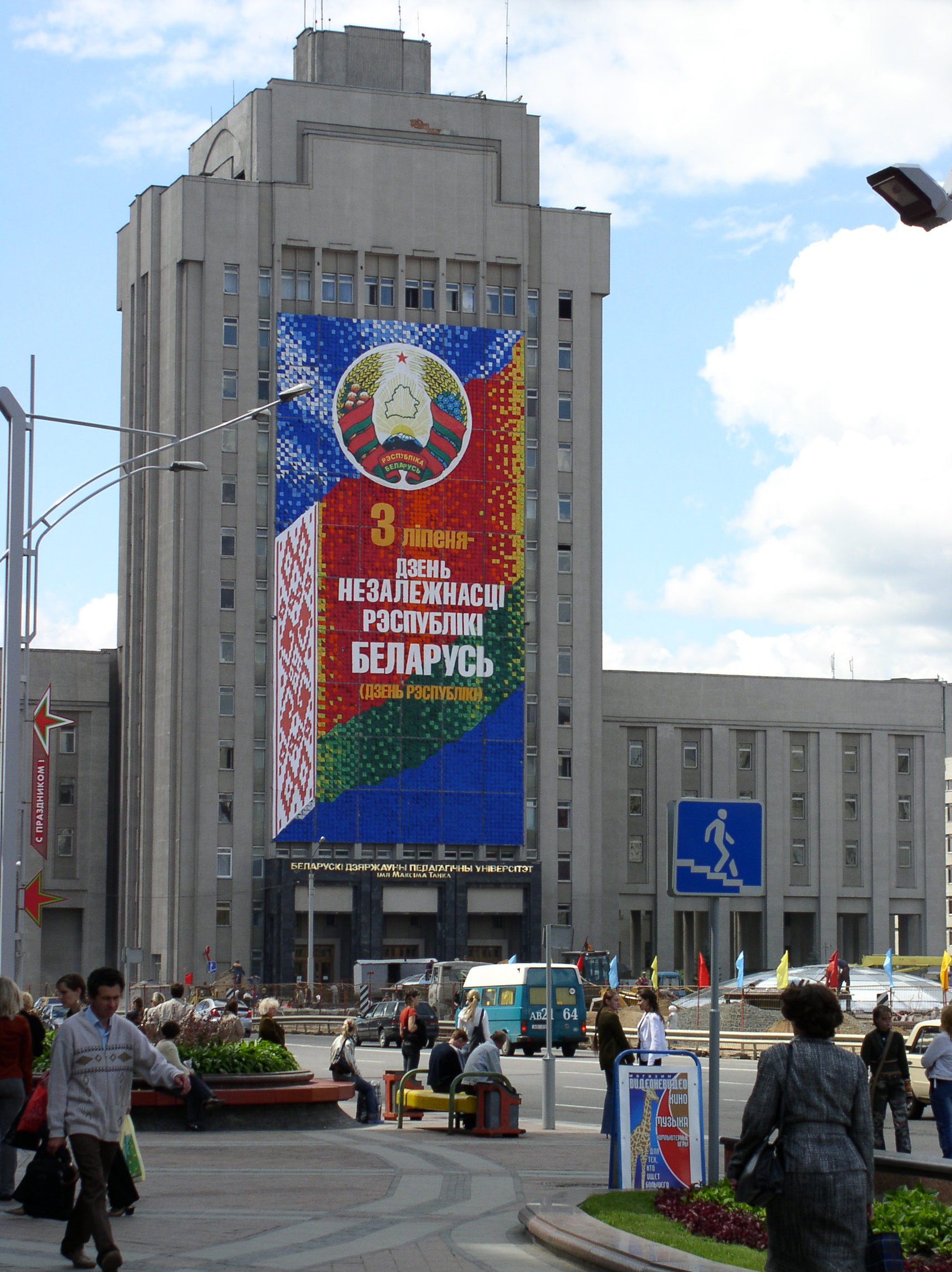
A sign commemorating Independence Day on the building of the Maxim Tank Belarusian State Pedagogical University.

The main event of Independence Day is a military parade of the Belarusian Armed Forces's Minsk Garrison. Parades are also held in Barysaw, Gomel, Brest, Dzyarzhynsk, Haradok, Vitebsk and Mogilev. After the official part, the holiday social events start. A solemn ceremony headed by the President of Belarus is held in the Independence Palace the preceding day. Recently, in 2014 and 2019, the holiday has been celebrated with even more importance due to it celebrating the 70th and 75th anniversary of the liberation of Belarus respectively. In both instances, the annual parade took place at nine o'clock in the evening and included cadets form the Military Academy dressed up as Soviet-era Belarusian Partisans. In the latter celebration, the Russian Defence Ministry conducted a fireworks display in Moscow in honor of the anniversary.

In 2021, the parade was cancelled due to the 2020 Belarusian protests, with a ceremony being held at the Mound of Glory.

=== Social events ===
Throughout the country celebrations and festivities are held. In the evening in Minsk fireworks are arranged. A series of concerts and events are held in Gomel, with a special emphasis on the Belarusian identity. A national campaign called Let's Sing the Anthem Together (Russian: Давайте споем гимн вместе) for everyone capable to sing the national anthem (My Belarusy) at a certain time has occurred annually in recent years.

For those of the Catholic faith, the religious hymn "Almighty God" (Belarusian: Magutnyj Boža) is sung at the end of mass on 3 July.

=== State visits associated with the holiday ===
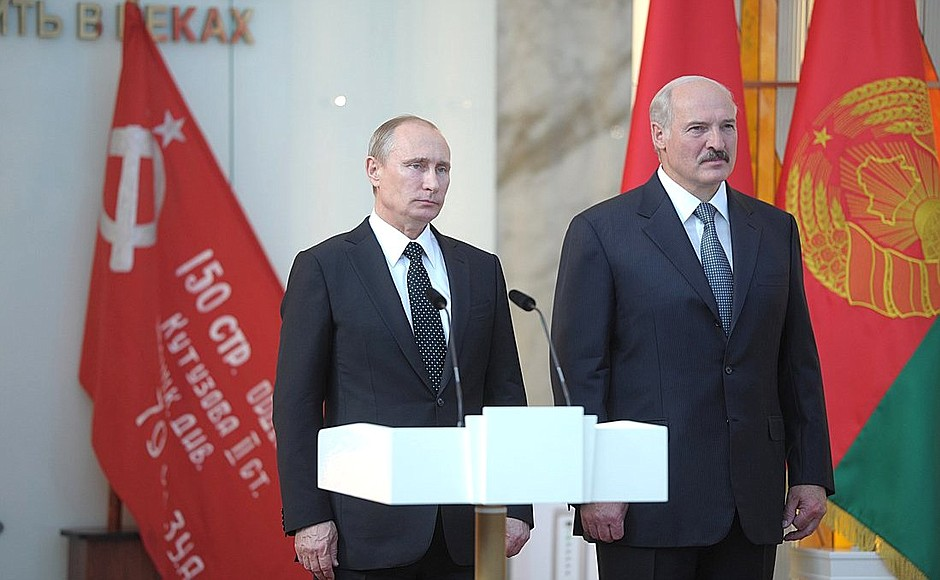
Vladimir Putin and Alexander Lukashenko attending the inauguration of a new building in the museum in 2014.

In 1974, President Richard Nixon of the United States arrived in Minsk during a state visit to the Belarusian SSR to attend celebrations in honor of the 30th anniversary of the liberation of Belarus. Attending the 2013 parade were the Presidents of Venezuela and Laos, Nicolás Maduro and Choummaly Sayasone, respectively. In 2014, Russian President Vladimir Putin visited Belarus on the eve of Independence Day, attending the inauguration of the Belarusian Great Patriotic War Museum. During the 2019 celebrations, Azerbaijani defense minister Zakir Hasanov, Commander Russian Western Military District Viktor Astapov, and Uzbek army chief Pavel Ergashev were in attendance.

== See also ==
- 2008 Minsk bombing
- List of national independence days
