= Museum of the Great Patriotic War =

Museum of the Great Patriotic War may refer to one of the following history museums established in the Soviet Union for the Eastern Front (World War II):

- Museum of the Great Patriotic War, Moscow
- Belarusian Great Patriotic War Museum
- National Museum of the History of Ukraine in the Second World War, formerly Museum of the Great Patriotic War in Kyiv

== See also ==
- Patriotic War (disambiguation)
- Great Patriotic War (term)
