= Minsk bombing =

Minsk bombing may refer to several events occurred in Minsk, the capital of Belarus:

- Bombing of Minsk in World War II, an aerial bombing operation occurred in 1941
- 2008 Minsk bombing, a terrorist attack occurred in 2008
- 2011 Minsk Metro bombing, a terrorist attack occurred in 2011
