= Minsk Hero City Obelisk =

Monument in Belarus

Coordinates: 53°54′57″N 27°32′17″E

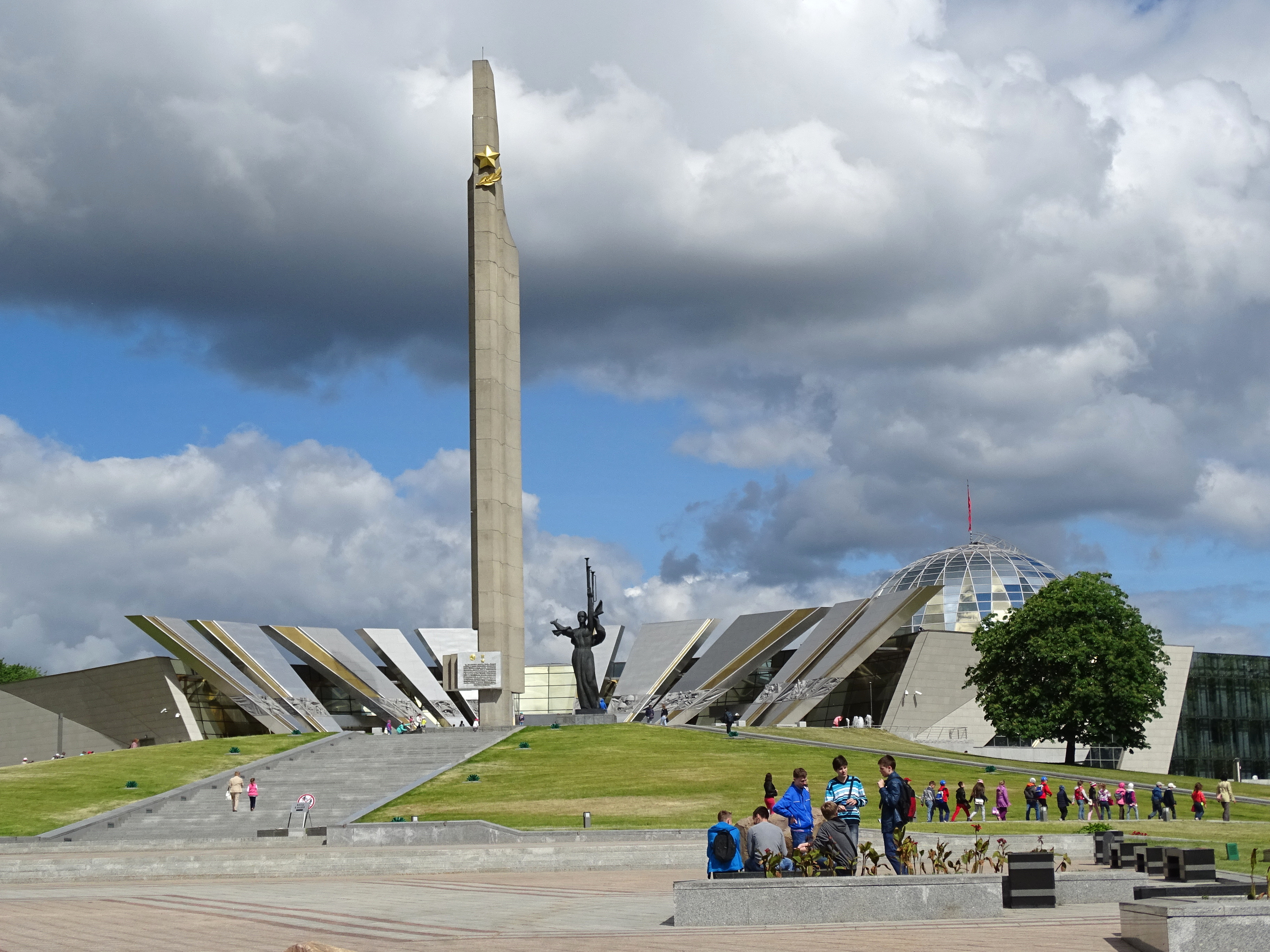
- The Obelisk in 2016
- Interactive map of Minsk Hero City Obelisk
- Location: Victors Avenue 8, Minsk, Belarus
- Height: 45 metres (147.6 feet)
- Opening date: 1985

Minsk Hero City Obelisk is a 45 meter tall monument in the shape of an obelisk located on Victors Avenue in Minsk, Belarus. The Obelisk is dedicated to the fact that Minsk was declared a Hero City on 26 June 1974 for its people's bravery during the Nazi occupation that lasted for 1,100 days. The Obelisk was opened in 1985, commemorating the 40th anniversary of victory in the Great Patriotic War.

== Construction ==
The designer of the Obelisk was a sculptor Valentin Zankovich. He embodied the vision of the architects V. Yevseev, V. Kramarenko, and V. Romanenko. The monument is topped with the Gold Star medal and surrounded by the laurel branch.

== Complex ==
At the moment, the Obelisk is a part of the large complex of the Belarusian Great Patriotic War Museum. At the bottom visitors can see an engraved text that describes the acquisition of the «Hero City» title by Minsk. Standing with fanfares raised high, the symbolic figure of the Motherland is part of the monument. Nowadays military parades and processions on the day of the key national holiday – Independence Day – take place near the Minsk Hero City Obelisk.

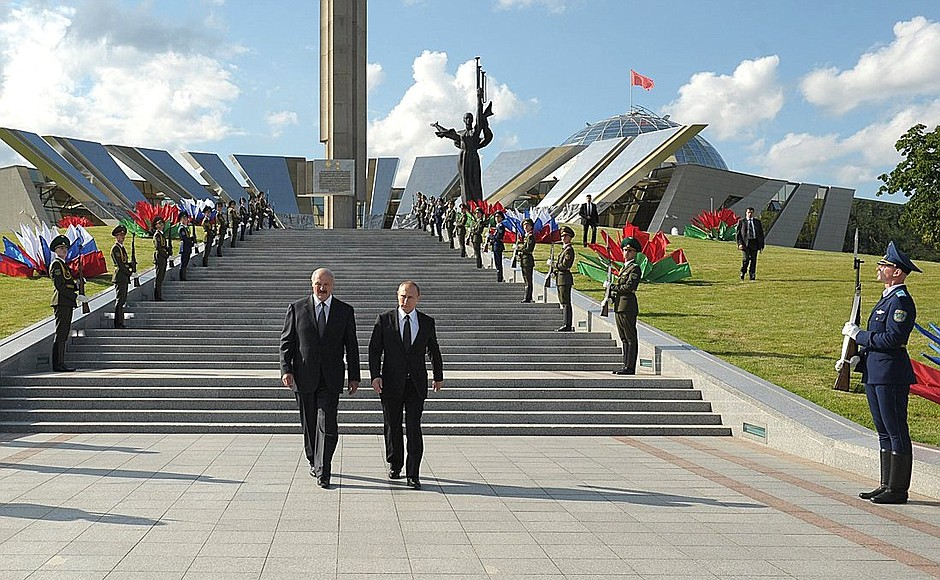
Vladimir Putin and Alexander Lukashenko near the Obelisk in 2014

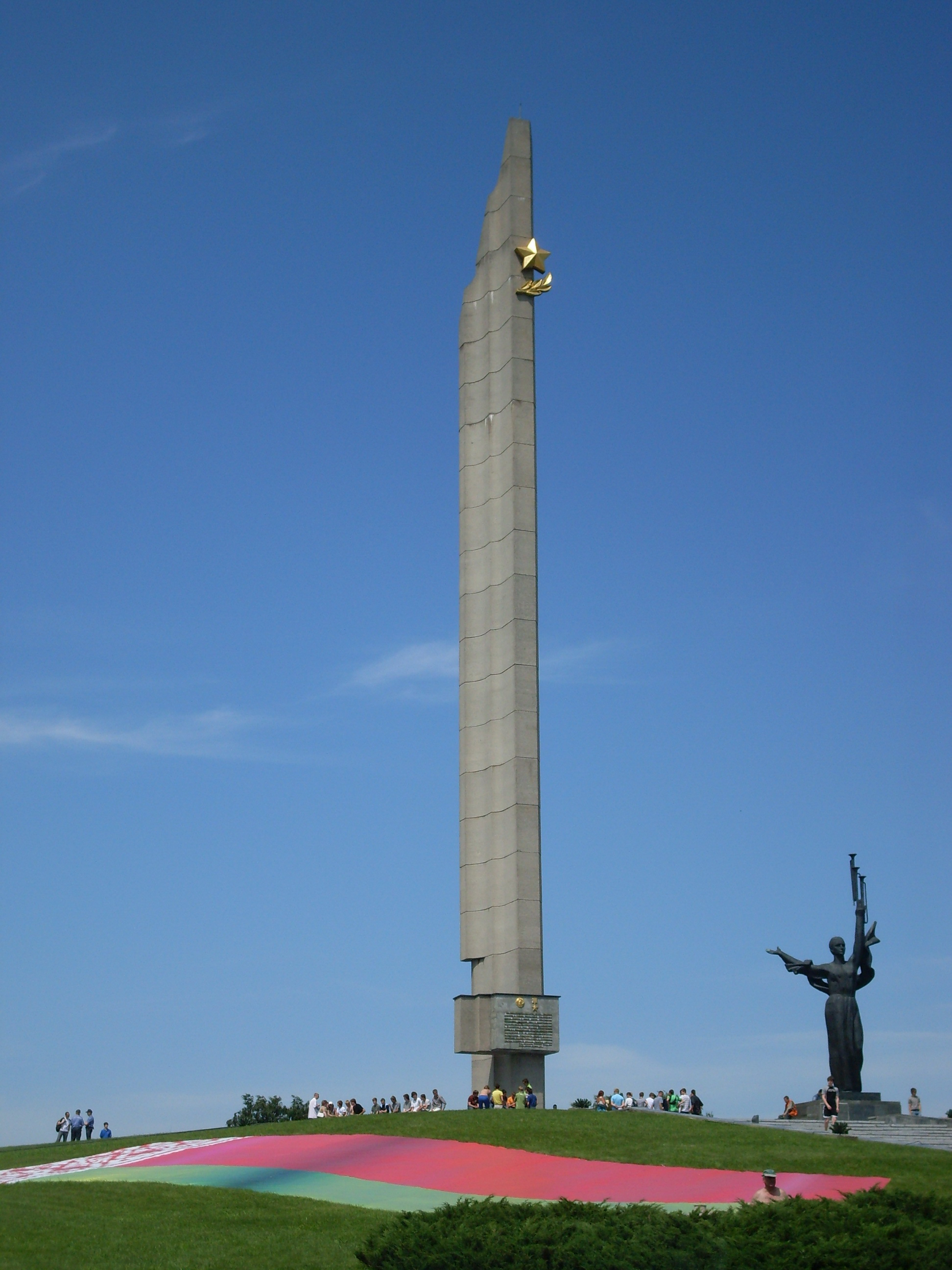
The Obelisk in 2009

== See also ==
- Leningrad Hero City Obelisk
- Hero City
