= Patriotic War =

Patriotic War is a term most commonly used in Russia. The term may refer to one of the following wars.

== Wars between Russia and Western European powers ==
- French invasion of Russia, commonly known as the Patriotic War of 1812, Napoleon's invasion of Russia
- Eastern Front (World War I), occasionally referred to as the Second Patriotic War, the war between the German Empire and its allies against Russia during World War I
- Eastern Front (World War II), commonly known as the Great Patriotic War in the Soviet Union, the war between Nazi Germany and its allies against the Soviet Union during World War II
  - Great Patriotic War (term), the usage of term

== Other wars ==
- Croatian War of Independence (1991–1995), during the Yugoslav Wars between the newly self-declared independent Croatia, on one side, and the self-declared Republic of Serbian Krajina and Yugoslav People's Army forces, both of which were controlled by Socialist Republic of Serbia, on the other
- Second Nagorno-Karabakh War (2020), the war between Azerbaijan and Armenia over the disputed Nagorno-Karabakh region

== See also ==
- Museum of the Great Patriotic War (disambiguation)
