= Minsk Castle =

Wooden defensive structure in Minsk

- Мінскі замак
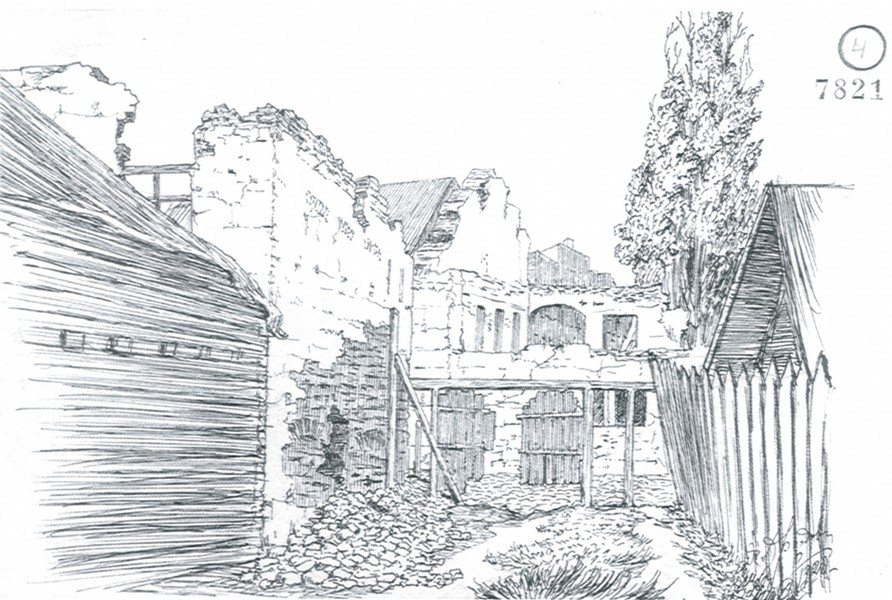
- Ruins of Minsk Castle (drawing by J. Drazdowicz)
- Interactive map of the Minsk Castle area

General information
- Type: castle
- Location: Minsk, Belarus
- Coordinates: 55°54′28″N 27°33′6″E
- Construction started: Second half of the 11th century
- Destroyed: Beginning of the 19th century, second half of the 20th century

The Minsk Castle (Belarusian: Мінскі замак, romanized: Minski zamak) was a wooden defensive structure in Minsk, built in the mid-11th century on the right bank of the Svislach river at its confluence with the Nyamiha river (in the area of March 8 Square); destroyed in the early 19th century, and ultimately leveled by the Soviet authorities in the 1950s. The area formerly surrounded by castle ramparts received the name Zamczysko.

== Research status ==
The Minsk Castle was built on a natural island where the Nyamiha river flows into the Svislach river. The Nyamiha river has survived to this day in the form of a small stream, enclosed in concrete collectors. The castle grounds were located near the present-day March 8 Square. Currently, the Victors Avenue runs alongside it.

Mentions of the Minsk Castle include notes from the Moscow merchant Trifon Korobeynikov from 1593 and correspondence between Tsar Alexis of Russia and the Moscow voivodes appointed by him for the Lithuanian cities during the Russo-Polish War of 1654–1667. Plans of the castle from the 18th to 19th centuries have been preserved, marking the location of fragments of the rampart. In the 1950s, before the construction of the Park Avenue thoroughfare (now Victors Avenue), traces of the old street system were visible.

Archaeological excavations on the site of today's March 8 Square, located on a small hill measuring 75×45 meters, began in the mid-20th century. They were conducted in several stages: from 1945 to 1951 and from 1957 to 1961, as well as in 1976. The research revealed that the city was initially planned as a fortress to protect the borders. Previous analysis of the cultural layers of the rampart did not show any human presence in this area before the construction of the castle in the second half of the 11th century. Dendrochronological studies of the beams, which reinforced the rampart, allowed the determination of the time of the first buildings on this site to the year 1063. In 1949, at a depth of 1.5 meters near the present-day House of Physical Culture of the DSO Trudovyje rezerwy, remnants of a temple were discovered in the eastern part of the castle. Scientists date its construction using the stratigraphic method to the years 1071–1085. There is no mention in any written sources that there was a Christian temple in Minsk in the 11th century.

== History ==
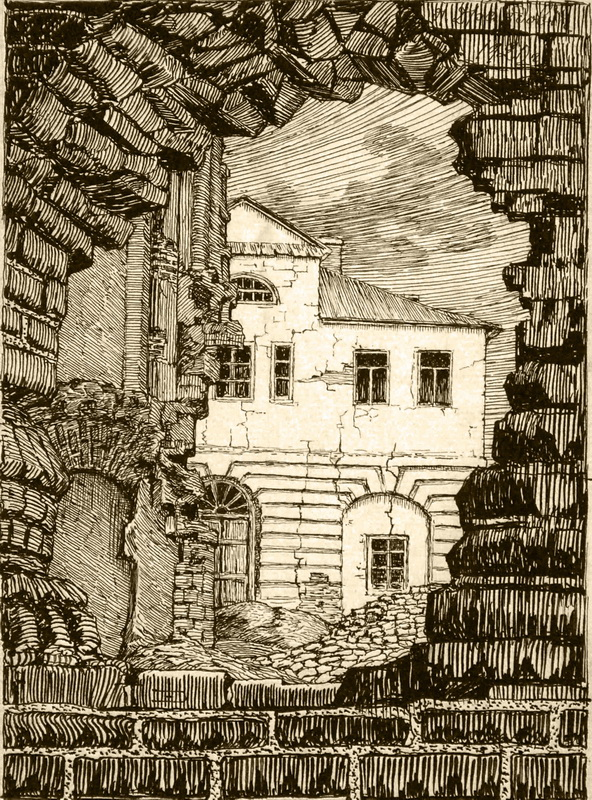
Ruins of the Minsk Castle (drawing by J. Drazdowicz)

Minsk first appeared in written sources in the Primary Chronicle under the year 1067. It belonged to the Principality of Polotsk. On the right bank of the Svislach river, at the confluence of the Nyamiha River, a wooden castle was built in the second half of the 11th century, intended to serve as a defensive fortification for the southern borders of the state of Vseslav of Polotsk. For unknown reasons, however, the construction was never completed. The castle was surrounded by a rampart, with some sections reaching over 10 meters in height. The castle's defenses also included a moat filled with water.

In the 12th and 13th centuries, a town began to form around the castle – in the southern, southwestern, and southeastern directions; the defensive stronghold consisted of 80–82 houses and around 400–500 residents. By the late 15th and early 16th centuries, the castle possessed a considerable number of cannons and other similar weaponry. According to the Bychowiec Chronicle, in 1505, the castle repelled an invasion by the Tatars led by Meñli I Giray, while the city itself was burned.

The 16th century saw the development of the city. The areas around the castle were developed into a crafts and trade posad. On the adjacent hill, to the south of the castle, a new center of economic and cultural life emerged – the High Market, with a town hall erected at its center. The favorable location of the new district, away from the marshy areas around the castle hill, provided greater opportunities for Minsk's economic development and diminished the significance of the castle. By the mid-16th century, the Minsk Castle was merely a part of the urban public space. Within its grounds were buildings such as residential houses, the Nativity of the Theotokos Church, warehouses, stables, and a prison housed in one of the towers. The wooden fortifications of the castle were repeatedly destroyed by fires, for example, in 1505, 1547, 1552, 1569, and others. Despite being rebuilt each time, it gradually ceased to fulfill its defensive function.

After the signing of the Union of Lublin in 1569, Minsk became the capital of the Minsk Voivodeship, and the castle buildings were allocated for administrative use. From 1581, sessions of the Supreme Tribunal of the Grand Duchy of Lithuania were held at the castle. The sessions lasted for 12 weeks every two years, elevating the city's status to the same level as Novogrudok and Vilnius. Until the mid-17th century, the castle served as the residence of the viceroy of the Grand Duchy. From 1612, the city archive was housed in the castle's judicial building. Documents from the 17th and 18th centuries typically mention the Minsk Castle as the venue for noble sejmiks, yet as late as 1750, it was still garrisoned. In the 17th century, a brick building of the district court (castle court) was erected within the castle, known from drawings by Jazep Drazdovič and photographs from the first half of the 20th century.

Due to warfare during the conflicts of the 17th and 18th centuries, along with accompanying epidemics, Minsk was nearly completely destroyed and depopulated. During the Russo-Polish War of 1654–1667, the castle and the city were occupied by the forces of Tsar Alexis of Russia from 1655 to 1660. Simultaneously, the city was the theater of Russian military actions led by Ivan Khovansky against the Lithuanians until Minsk was recaptured by the combined Lithuanian-Polish forces in 1660. During the Great Northern War from 1700 to 1721, the castle was successively destroyed by Russian and Swedish forces. In 1778, it was destroyed by fire. The last written record of it appeared in 1793 in a survey conducted by Russian officials after the annexation of Minsk by the Russian Empire following the partitions of Poland. After the partitions of Poland, the castle buildings passed into private hands and underwent degradation.

Until the mid-19th century, Zamczysko was one of the commercial centers of Minsk. At the turn of the 19th and 20th centuries, the area around the former castle saw the expansion of urban transportation lines. As a result of clearing the area after the castle, only the ramparts remained. In 1931, a square called March 8 Square was built on the former castle grounds. In the second half of the 20th century, during archaeological excavations, the castle hill was excavated, and the soil was removed beyond the city limits. To this day, remnants of the oldest cultural layer, protected by the Belarusian state, have survived.

== Architecture ==
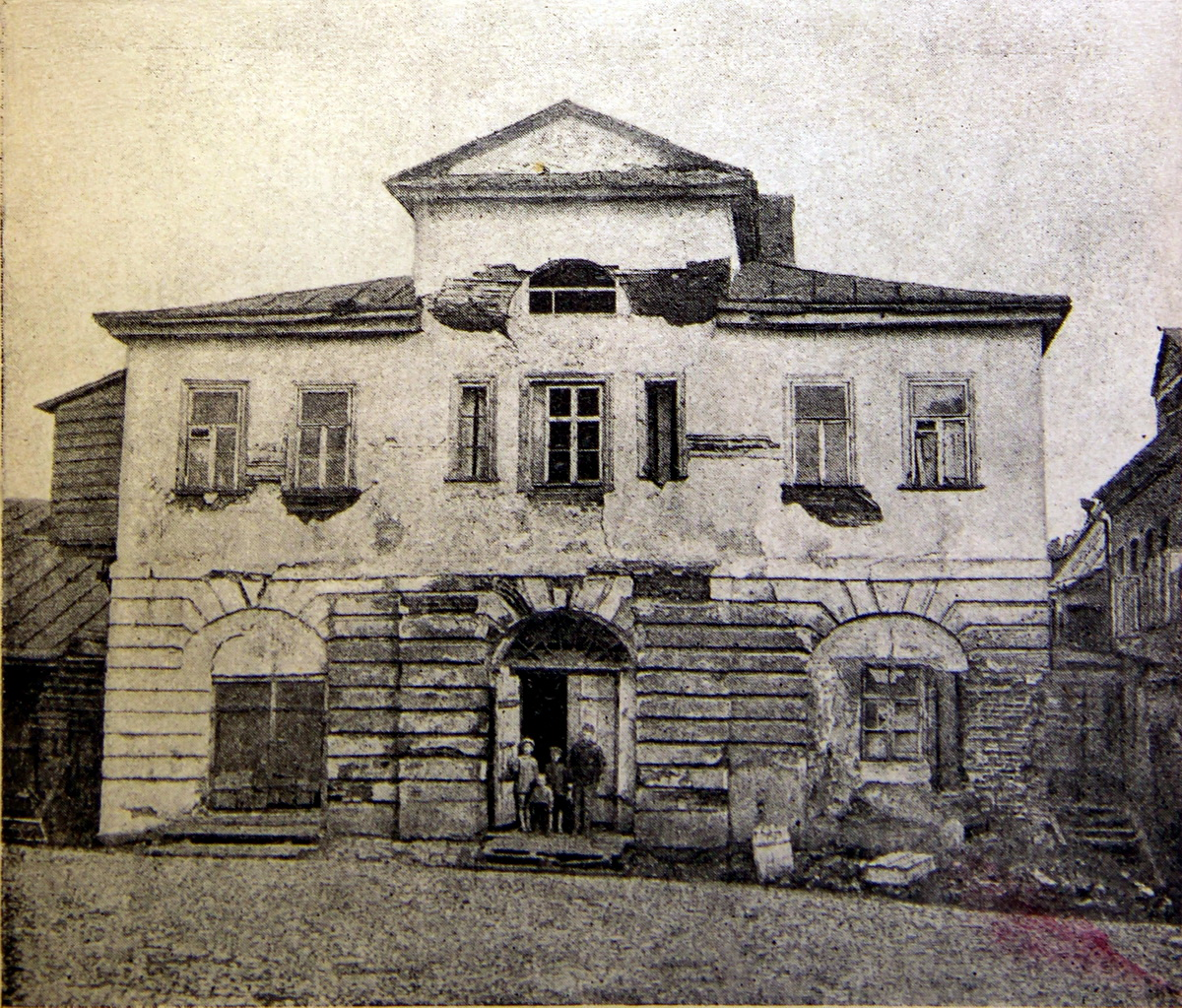
The old building of the district court, located on the castle grounds (picture from the early 20th century)

=== Defensive constructions ===
The castle was situated on a small elongated hill. The castle grounds were surrounded by the left branch of the Nyamiha river from the southeast. Presumably, it was called Mienka or Mień and no longer exists today. The Svislach river flowed from the east. From the north, west, and southwest, as indicated by a plan from 1773, the castle hill was protected by marshy and swampy areas. Based on archaeological research, it was determined that the castle was only a fragment of a fortified settlement located on a relatively flat part of the hill.

The strategic location of the Minsk Castle on a natural island was reinforced by an artificial embankment, built of sand and stabilized with wooden structures made of logs. The construction of the embankment was carried out in two stages. Initially, its width was 14 m, which was later increased to 22–25 m, and in some sections, up to 30–32 m. The inner slope was covered with turf. The outer side of the embankment had a slope of 50–52°, while the inner side had a slope of 47°. The inner slope had profiled stairs. The base of the southeastern part of the embankment, near the river, was additionally reinforced with a massive wooden substructure consisting of nine layers of long pine logs, laid closely together perpendicular to the axis of the embankment. Beams were placed between the layers, forming part of the main structure of the embankment.

The Minsk Castle was constructed of wood. Its height, along with the embankment, ranged from 13 (embankment height – 8 m, wooden palisade height – 5 m) to 15 m. The castle was surrounded by a water-filled moat. In plan, the castle had a semicircular shape. Its area was 3 hectares. Stretching from the bank of the Svislach to the northeast, it was 270–300 m long, and its width in the middle reached 150 m. The entrance to the castle was a heavily guarded passage 3.4 m wide. The gate was located in the southeastern part of the castle. On the left side, it was concealed by the forward-leaning embankment, which reduced the impact force in case of artillery fire. Presumably, there were two towers on either side of the gate, built in the second half of the 11th century. According to plans from 1773, the castle embankment had two openings for entrance gates: from the north and from the southeast. The southeastern gate passed through the Great Street (later Staro-Miasnicka). In plans from 1793 and 1797, the embankment already had three openings. Another gate was built in its northern part.

=== Internal planning ===
The central area within the castle walls was intersected by streets measuring 3–4 m in width, running towards the castle gate. Their branches led to residential buildings. The streets were paved with logs, perpendicular to longitudinal beams laid underneath them in 2–3 rows. The main street of the fortress was called Zamkowa and traversed the area inside the castle walls from the southeast to the northwest. It began approximately 300 m from the Svislach river. Over time, it was extended beyond the embankment until it intersected with Wielka Tatarska Street (now Dimitrova; its section outside the walls still exists today), which slightly turned south and served as its continuation. On the other side, Zamkowa Street ended at the height of the later streets Podzamcze and Zawalna, which formed a semicircle from the west. One of the larger streets crossed the eastern part of the castle courtyard in a north–south direction. Its width was 4 m. Smaller lanes branched off from it. During archaeological excavations conducted on this street, a 40-meter section with 13 preserved beams of the wooden pavement was uncovered. Streets such as Podzamcze, Zawalna, its side street, and others within the castle, such as Miasnicka and Wałowa, did not survive.

The castle courtyard area was divided into courts enclosed by a palisade made of logs dug into the ground. During excavations, remains of approximately 130 wooden buildings dating from the 11th to the 14th centuries were discovered. Some of the courts had 4–5 outbuildings and 1–2 izba chambers built along the palisade. The open spaces in front of the houses were covered with wooden flooring.

The predominant architectural form consisted of single-story log buildings, which comprised 80% of the castle's structures. These buildings typically had one room measuring 16–25 m^{2}. Entrances to the chambers were constructed facing the courtyard. The chambers had wooden floors, placed at a height between the second and third or third and fourth beams. In the izba chambers, clay stoves without chimneys were installed in the corner near the entrance (smoke escaped through window openings or doors), reinforced with a frame made of sticks or straw. Stones formed the base of the stoves. 20% of the internal castle buildings had post-and-beam construction and were used for economic purposes. The lifespan of one building averaged 20–30 years. It was determined that identical buildings were erected in place of destroyed houses and streets were laid out in the same manner. This was a characteristic feature of Minsk's spatial planning.

=== Castle temple ===
In layers dated to the 11th century, the stone foundation of a temple measuring 12×16 m was discovered. It was located in the eastern part of the castle and had three semicircular apses. In the central part of the temple, the bases of four columns were preserved, opposite which, to the south and north on the inner side of the walls, two rectangular lesenes were uncovered. The temple was built of stones joined with lime mortar. At the southwest corner, fragments of a wall smoothed from the inside with limestone blocks were preserved. The walls of the temple were up to 1.5 m thick. For unknown reasons, the temple was not completed, as evidenced by the lack of a floor and traces of ceilings laid on top of the walls. In the mid-12th century, this place was transformed into a necropolis. 21 burials with remains in wooden coffins were discovered here. In the first half of the 13th century, a street was laid out in this area, and a wooden pavement was laid. Probably, the castle had a second temple. Written sources from the 16th century mention the Soborna Church. Presumably, the record referred to a temple located near the gate and marked on eighteenth-century plans.

The architecture of the first Minsk temple was characteristic of the 11th century, as evidenced by the three apses. According to archaeologists, this place of worship has no equivalents among monumental buildings in Rus. For example, the Polotsk temple was built of bricks, like other known oldest temples in Belarus. It is likely that a master from the Romanesque school was invited to Minsk, who used stones bonded with mortar to build the walls. Research indicates that the architect aimed to create a modest temple that would nevertheless be an ornament of the castle and dominate this part of the district. The fact that the Polotsk method of constructing monumental buildings was not adopted as a model suggests that work on the Minsk temple began between 1069 and 1073 when the castle may have belonged to Yaropolk Izyaslavich, the nephew of Casimir I the Restorer. Presumably, Yaropolk maintained close relations with his uncle's court, which influenced the use of the Western model of building religious objects.

== Bibliography ==
- "8 Marta płoszczad'" (in Russian). Archived from the original on 2018-03-07.
- Bielawska, Olga (2010-08-11). "Archieołogiczeskije raskopki na Minskom zamcziszcze budut wozobnowleny w 2011 godu". Biełorusskoje Tielegrafnoje Agienstwo (in Russian). Archived from the original on 2015-03-19.
- Chronika Bychowca. Translated by Ułaszczik, Nikołaj. Minsk: Wostocznaja litieratura. 1966. p. 152.
- "Istorija goroda Minska" (in Russian). Archived from the original on 2017-07-01.
- "Minsk. Historyja horada" (in Belarusian). Archived from the original on 2018-04-19.
- "Minsk – stolica Biełarusi". Priess-służba Priezidienta Riespubliki Biełarus' (in Russian). Archived from the original on 2016-03-04.
- "Minskij zamok". Sławnyj gorod Minsk! Encikłopiedija goroda Minska (in Russian). Archived from the original on 2016-04-11.
- Pazniak, Zianon (1985). Recha dauniaha czasu (in Belarusian). Minsk: Narodnaja aswieta.
- "Pierwyj Minskij Chram" (in Russian). Archived from the original on 2016-03-04.
- "Powiest' wriemiennych let" (in Russian).
- Chmara, Adam; Jelski, Aleksander (1885). "Mińsk". In Sulimierski, Filip; Chlebowski, Bronisław; Walewski, Władysław (eds.). Słownik geograficzny Królestwa Polskiego i innych krajów słowiańskich. Vol. 6. Warsaw: nakł. Władysława Walewskiego. pp. 453–469.
- Tkaczou, Michaił (2002). "Fortifikacija sriedniewiekowogo Mienska". Zamki Biełarusi (in Russian). Minsk: Belarus. pp. 47–54. ISBN 985-07-0418-7.
- Wałażynski, Uładzimir (2007). Šybieka, Zachar (ed.). Minsk. Stary i nowy (in Belarusian). Minsk: Charwiest. ISBN 978-985-16-0092-8.
- Zaharulski, Eduard (2010). Archieołogija Biełarusi (in Russian). Minsk: Belarusian State University.
- "Zamcziszcze". Minsk staryj i nowyj (in Russian). Archived from the original on 2016-04-11.
