= 2008 Minsk bombing =

Terrorist attack in Minsk, Belarus

Coordinates: 53°54′52″N 27°32′17″E

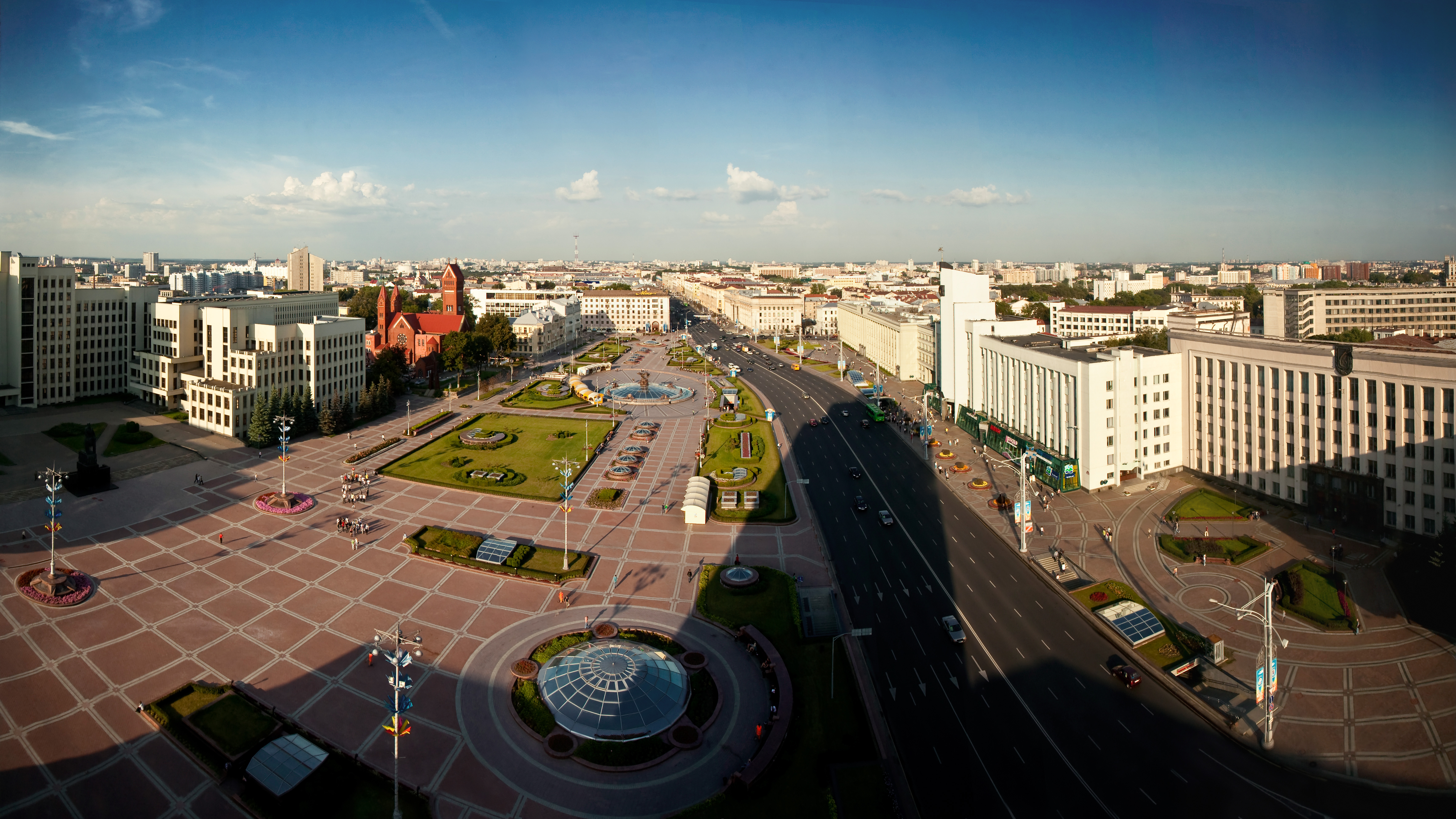
- Independence Square in Minsk, Belarus
- Location: Minsk, Belarus
- Date: 4 July 2008; Roughly 12:30 AM (UTC+3 (MSK))
- Deaths: 0
- Injuries: 54

The 2008 Minsk bombing took place just after midnight on 4 July 2008, in Minsk, Belarus and wounded 54 people. The explosion happened near the Hero City monument at a concert to celebrate Belarus' independence. The concert had been attended by Belarus' President, Alexander Lukashenko, who was not hurt and who officials said was not the target.

A second, larger bomb was discovered before the blast.

No clear motive for the blast has been revealed. However, Belarusian authorities detained four members of the White Legion, a nationalist group, in the days following the attack. The probable perpetrators of the explosion were detained during the investigation of the 2011 Minsk Metro bombing.
