= Victors Avenue =

Public avenue in Minsk, Belarus

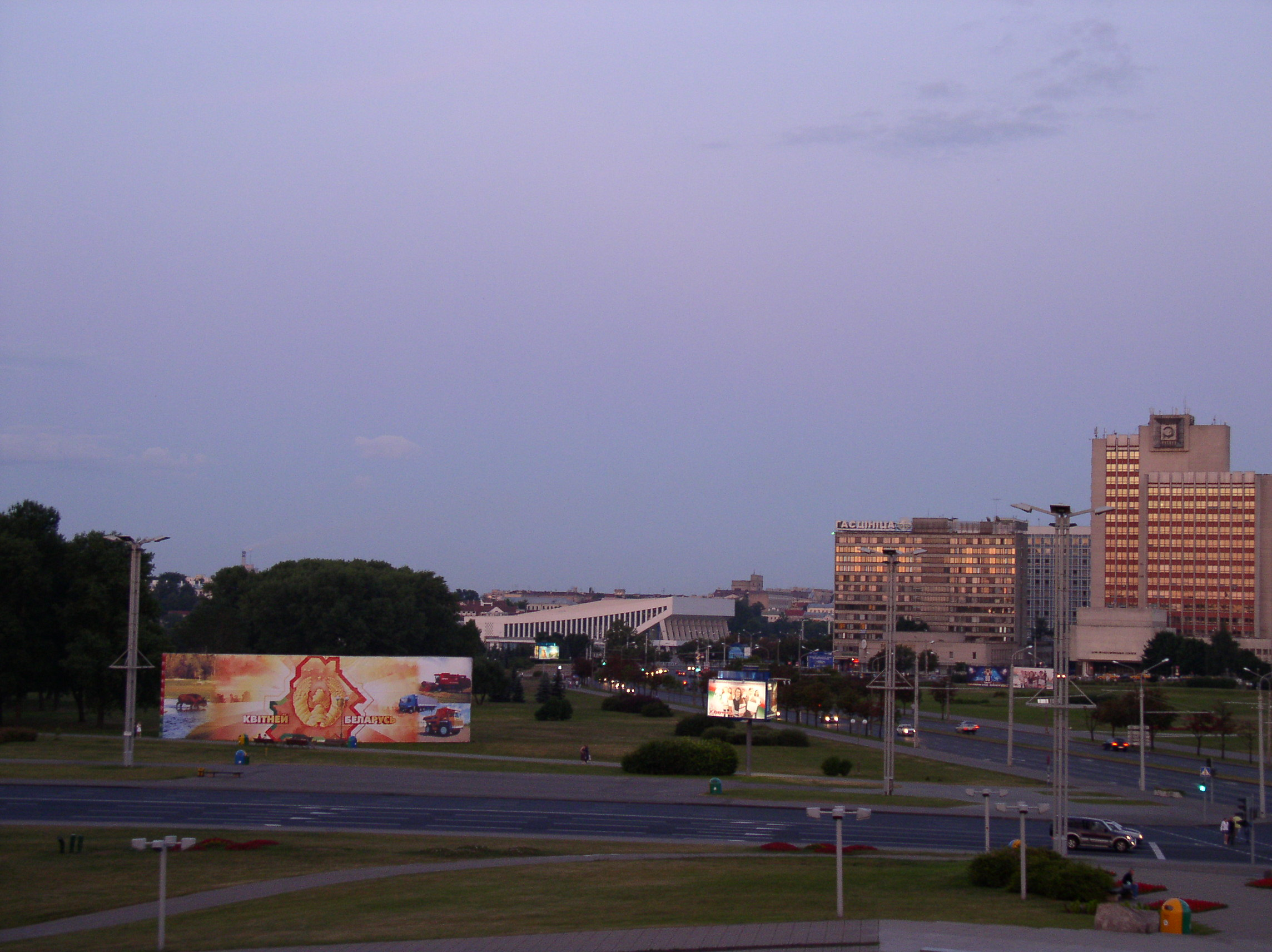
- The avenue at night
- Interactive map of Victors Avenue
- Native name: Праспект Пераможцаў (Belarusian)
- Former name: Masherov Avenue
- Location: Minsk, Belarus
- Coordinates: 53°55′04″N 27°33′00″E

Construction
- Completion: 1980

Victors Avenue (Belarusian: Праспект Пераможцаў, Russian: Проспект Победителей) is a public avenue in Minsk, Belarus.

== History ==
Until 1980, it was called the Park Highway. For a long time, the northwest center of Minsk along the right bank of the Svislach tributary of the river Berezina was poorly populated. The active development of the initial section of the Park Highway began in the 1960s. The modern avenue was created in 1980 as Masherov Avenue in honor of the leader of Soviet Belarus Petr Masherov. It was renamed to Victors Avenue in honor of the 60th anniversary of the end of World War II in 2005. In the 21st century, construction of a number of high-rise buildings were built on the avenue. In 2008, the construction of a residential complex "Slavyanskiy Kvartal" began. In 2012, the Deputy Minister of Architecture and Construction spoke out in support of the construction of a whole complex of skyscrapers on the initial section of the avenue. From 2011-2013, with the involvement of workers from North Korea, the Palace of Independence was built in the middle of the avenue, which later became the main residence of President of Belarus.

== Parades ==
It is the main venue for the annual Minsk Independence Day Parade on July 3. That was first held in 2004 for the 60th anniversary of the liberation of Belarus. The parade has also been broadcast from the avenue to all major channels. The military parade is followed by a Soviet-style march of gymnasts, sportsmen and civilians. The avenue also hosts the Victory Day Parade in Minsk, held every 5 years when the Independence Day parade is not being held.

One of the main sights of both parades is the T-34 tank leading the procession of vehicles for three miles along the avenue as well as the traditional drill performance from the Honor Guard Company of the Minsk Military Commandant.

== Demonstrations ==
During the 2020 Belarusian protests, the avenue was one of the centers of mass demonstrations. Many specifically went to Victors Avenue protest against the falsification of ballots. The protest on 18 August ended with law enforcement officers from the AMAP breaking up the crowd.

== Buildings ==
- Minsk Sports Palace
- Belarusian Great Patriotic War Museum
- Palace of Independence
- Cinema "Moscow"
- Football Manege
- Minsk Refrigerator Plant
- Minsk-Arena
- Minsk Castle

The Minsk Hero City Obelisk memorial commemorates the fact that Minsk was declared a Hero City on 26 June 1974 for the bravery of the residents during the Battle of Minsk in 1941.

== Transport ==
The Nyamiha Minsk Metro Station is located at the beginning of the avenue. In addition, there are several bus routes along the entire avenue, and trolleybuses run in the area of the Palace of Independence and in Vesnyanka. The trolleybus on the avenue began to run in 1967.

== Gallery ==
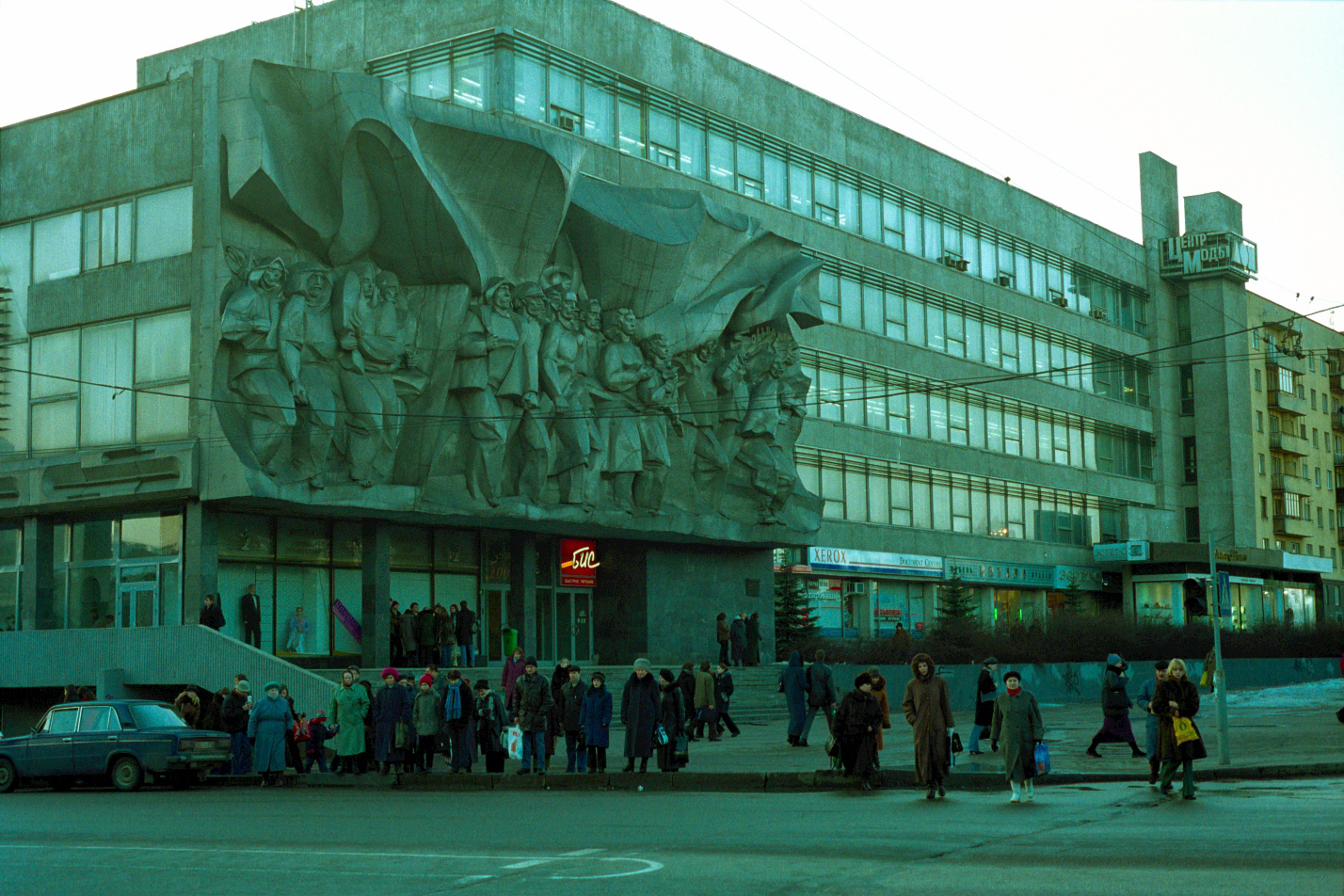

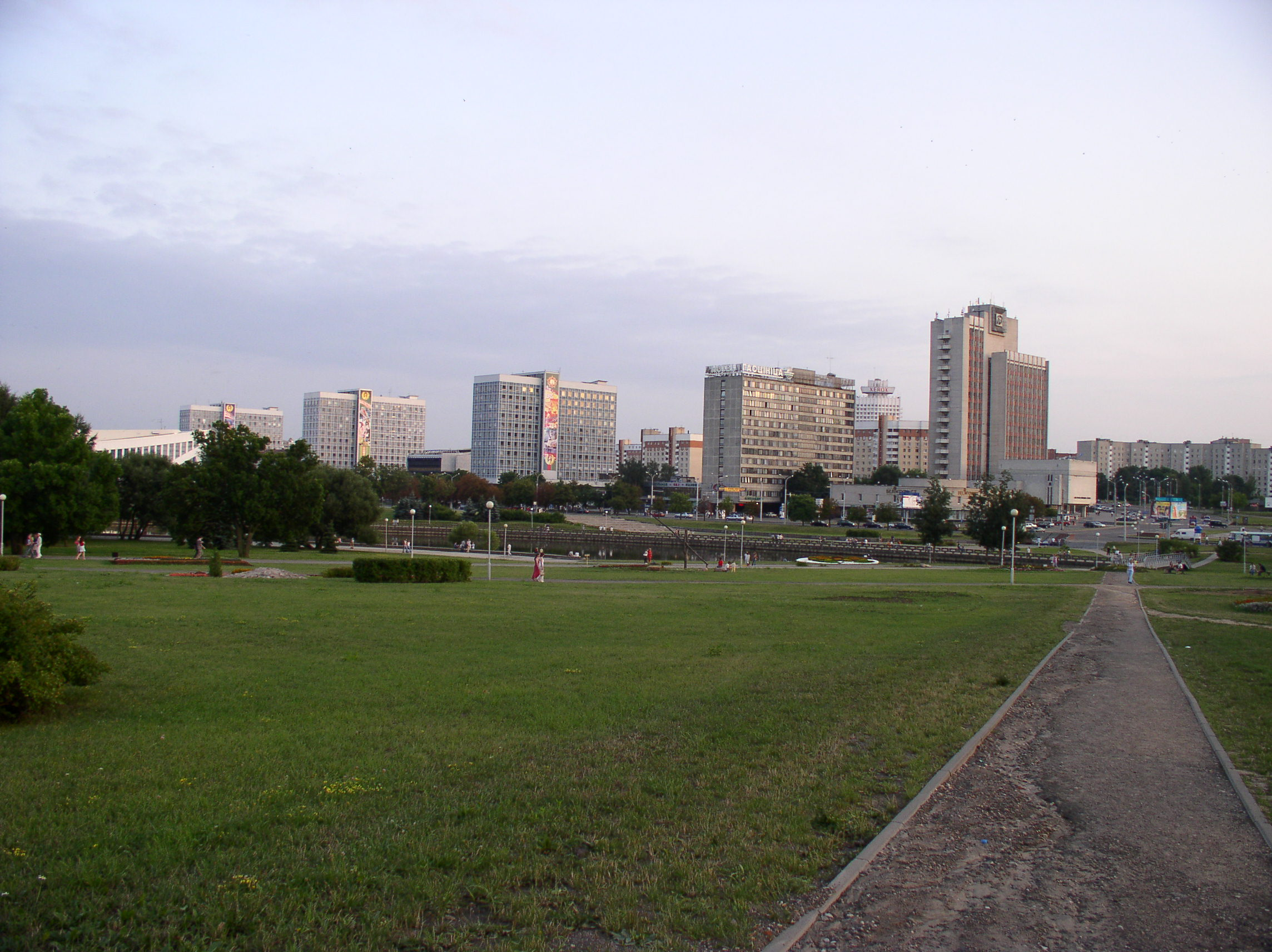

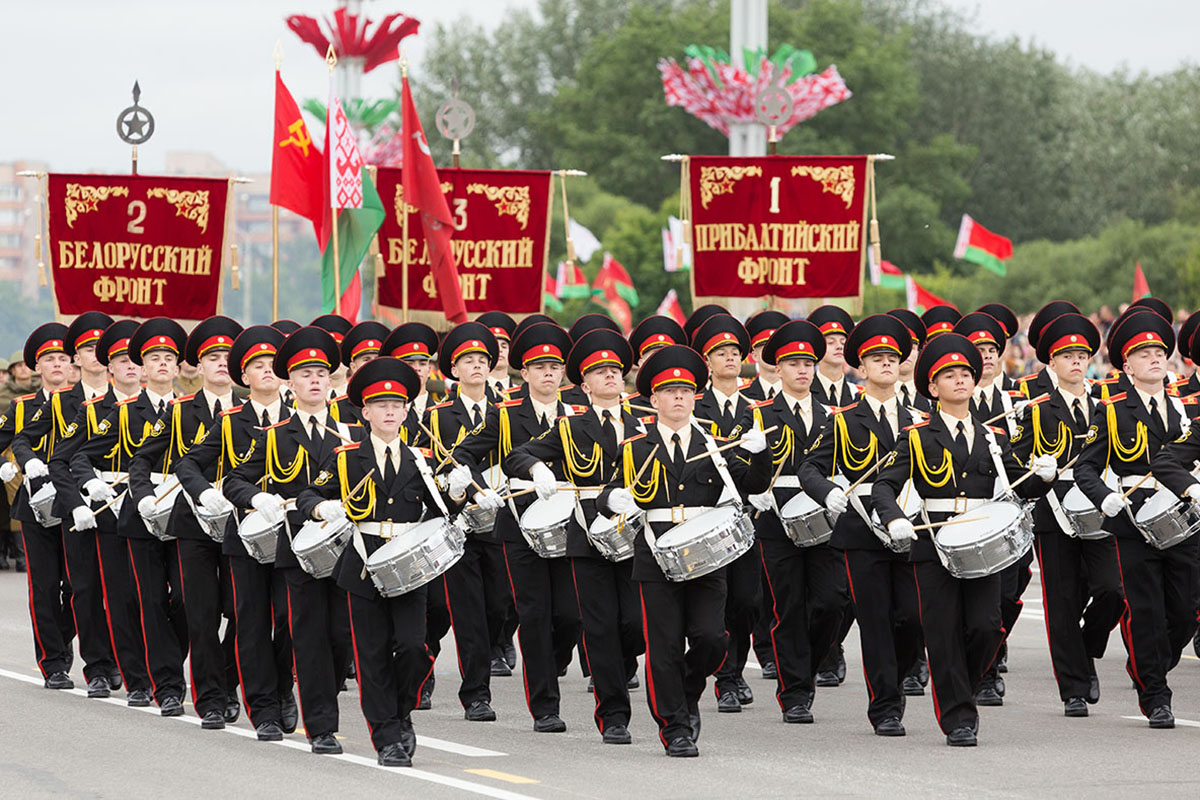
Drummers of the Minsk Suvorov Military School on the avenue during a parade in 2017.

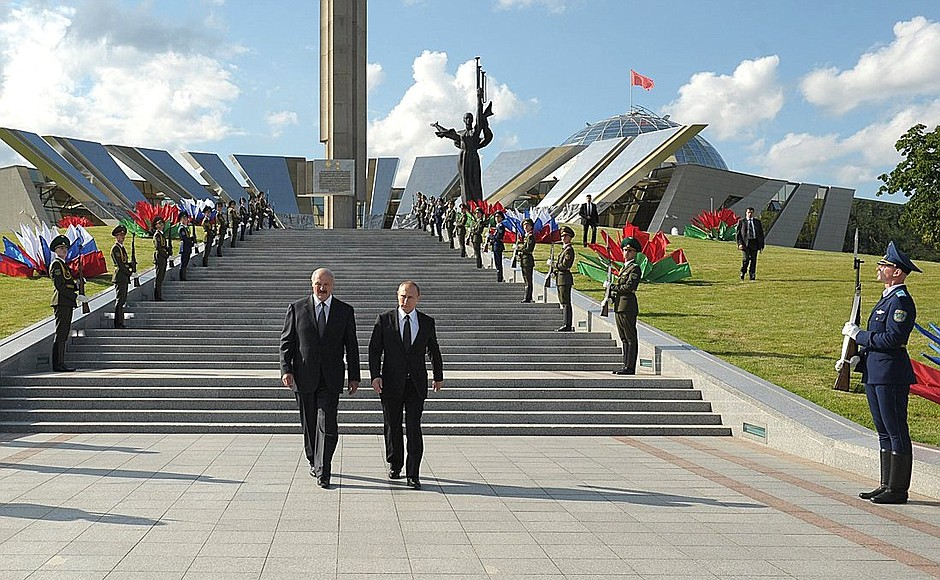
Vladimir Putin and Alexander Lukashenko at the Hero City Obelisk on Victors Avenue in Minsk.

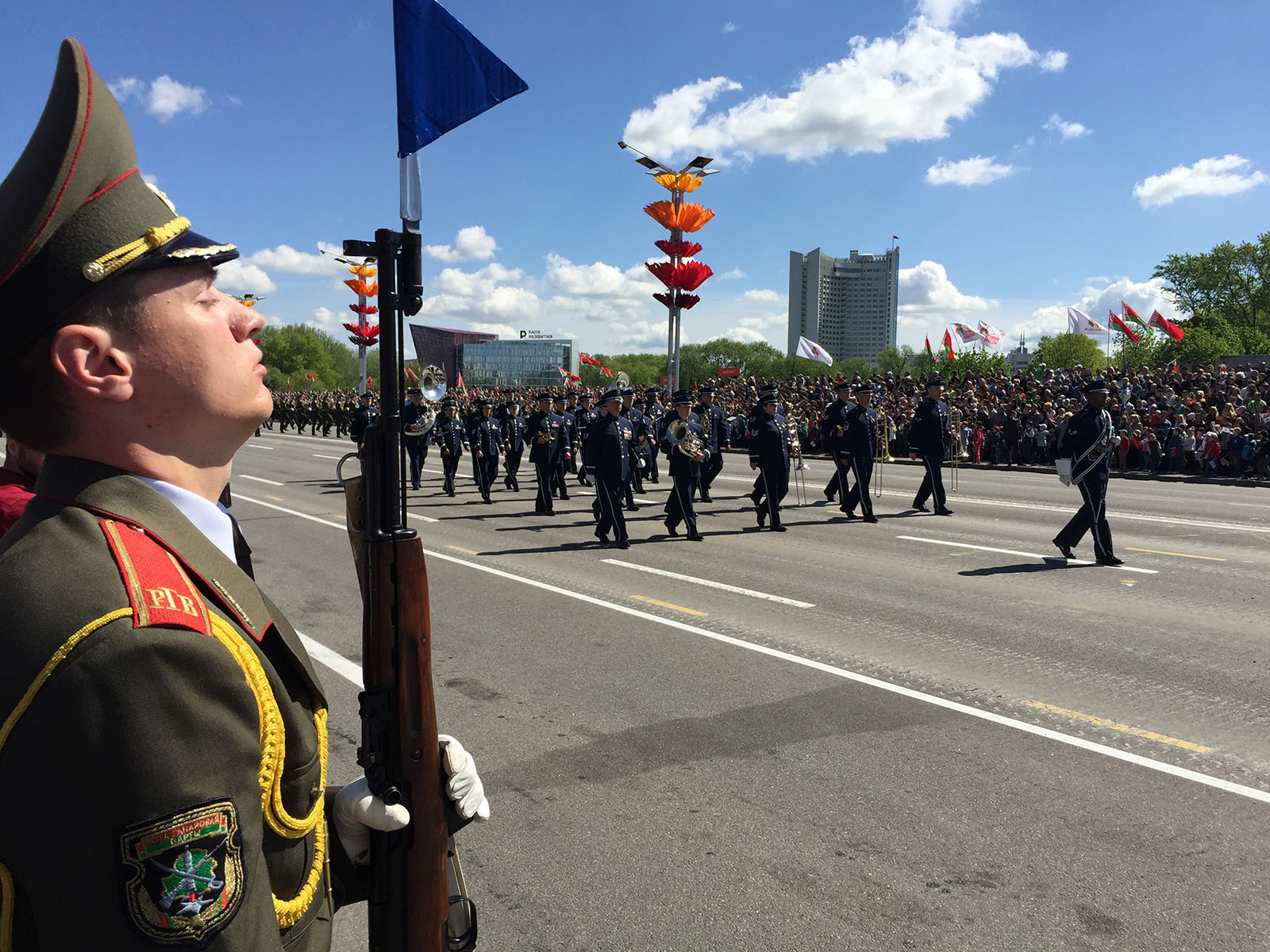
A parade on the avenue.

== See also ==
- Independence Square, Minsk
- October Square, Minsk
