= Belarusian Great Patriotic War Museum =

Museum in Minsk, Belarus

Belarusian State Great Patriotic War Museum
- Беларускі дзяржаўны музей гісторыі Вялікай Айчыннай вайны
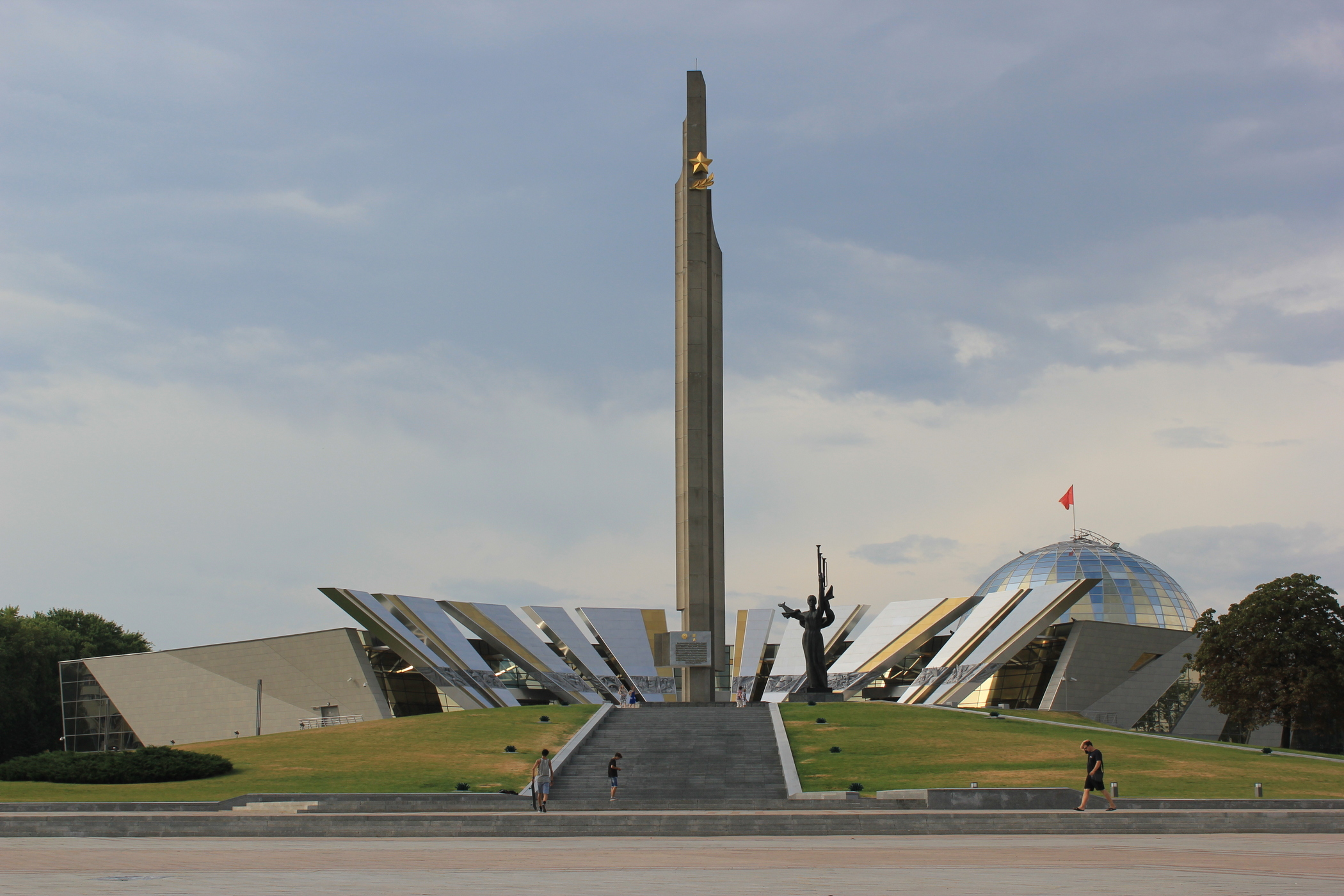
- The Belarusian State Great Patriotic War Museum and the Minsk Hero City Obelisk
- Established: 1943; 83 years ago
- Location: Victors Avenue 8, Minsk, Belarus
- Coordinates: 53.9161493°N 27.5380439°E
- Type: War museum
- Collection size: approx. 143 thousand objects
- Visitors: approx. 234,900 (2012)
- Public transit access: Nyamiha, Minsk Metro
- Website: warmuseum.by

The Belarusian State Great Patriotic War Museum (Belarusian: Беларускі дзяржаўны музей гісторыі Вялікай Айчыннай вайны, romanized: Belaruski dzi͡arz͡haŭny muzeĭ historyi Vi͡alikaĭ Aĭchynnaĭ vaĭny, Russian: Белорусский государственный музей истории Великой Отечественной войны) is a museum in Minsk, Belarus.

== History ==
The conception of a museum commemorating the Great Patriotic War after the end of Nazi occupation sprung up even before the close of the war, with the collection starting in November 1942. The museum first opened shortly after the liberation of Minsk from the Nazi invaders, on 25 October 1944, making it the first World War II museum to open during the course of the war. It moved location several times, first in 1966, then in 1977, and finally to its current location in 2014. The opening of the current building took place on the eve of the 70th anniversary of Belarusian independence, with both Belarusian President Alexander Lukashenko and Russian President Vladimir Putin present.

It is the most visited museum in Belarus.

== Collections ==
The museum has 28 collections divided across 10 themed exhibition halls. As of 2012 there were 142,676 items in the museum's collection. The museum is a total of 15,600m² of exhibition space.

The museum staff also engages in historical research: particular areas include Belarusians in the Red Army, local anti-fascist and partisan activity, and the history of the Auschwitz death camp.

The Minsk Hero City Obelisk is located outside of the museum.

== Gallery ==
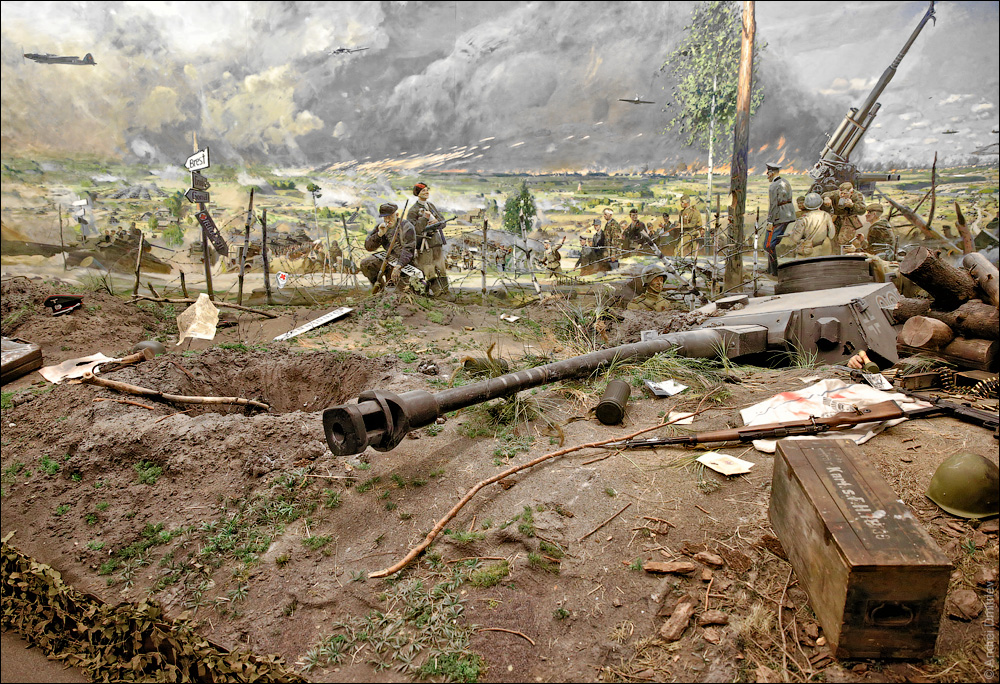

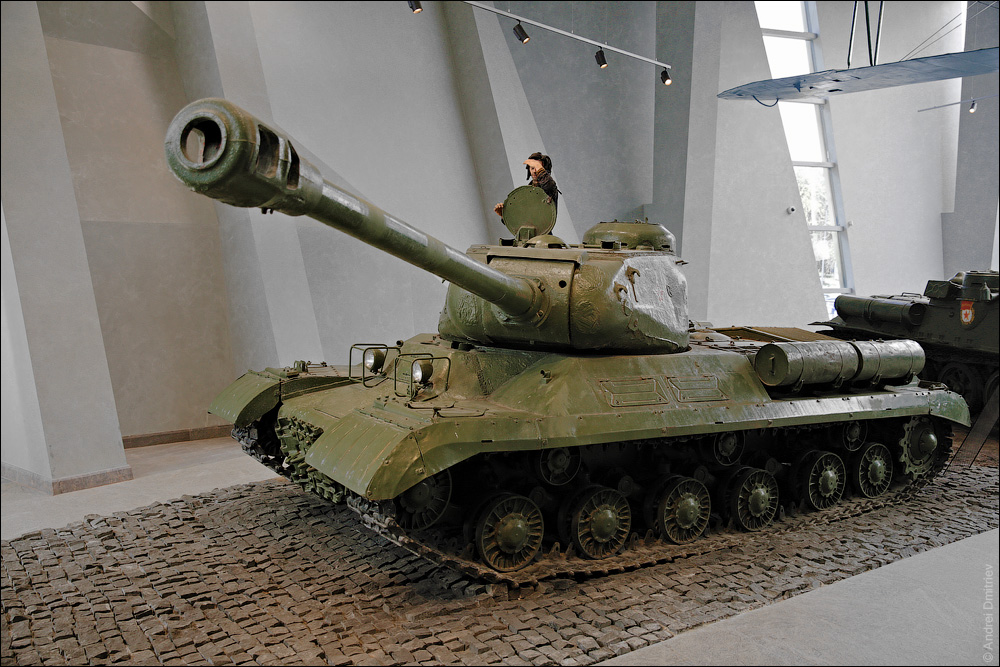

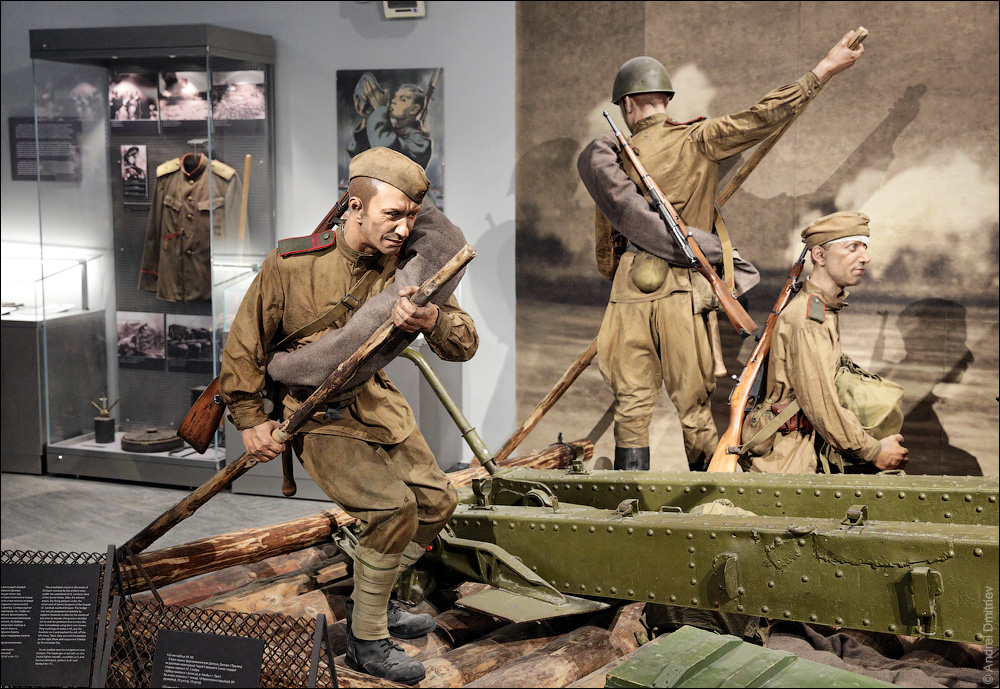

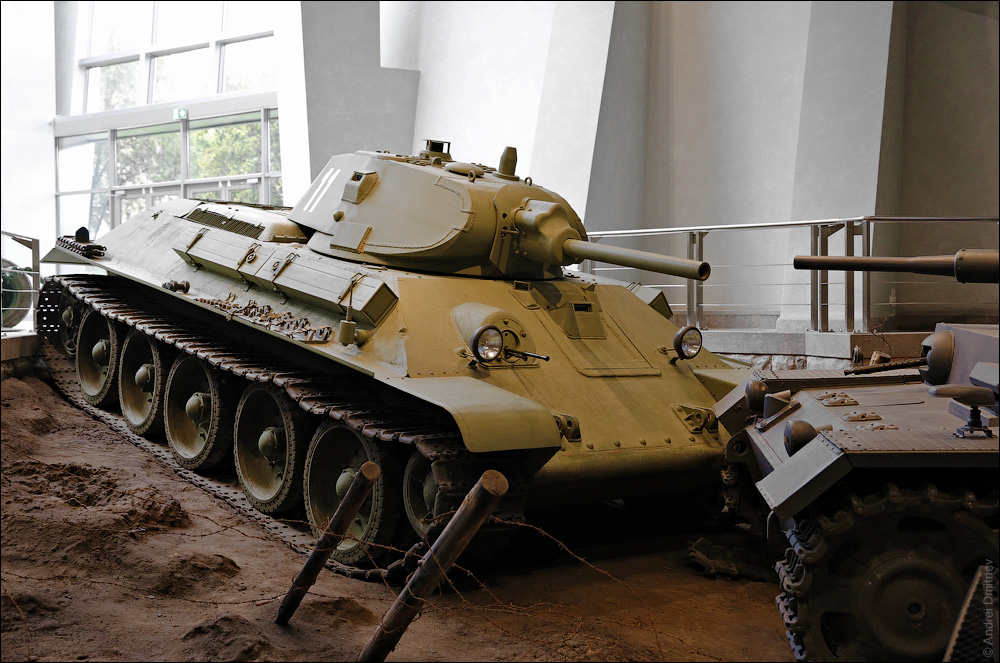

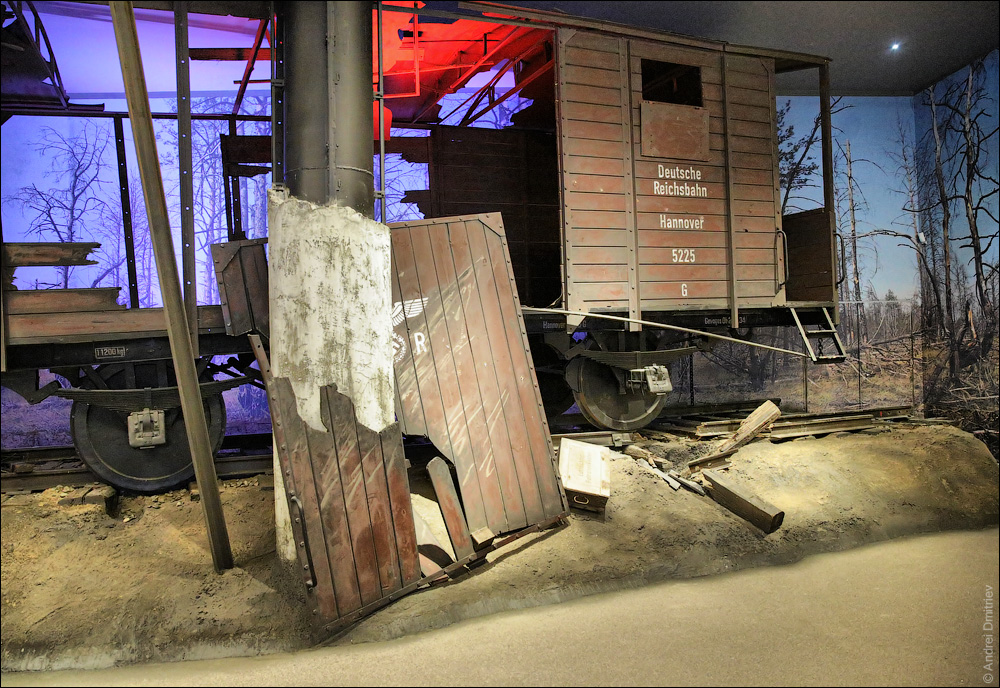

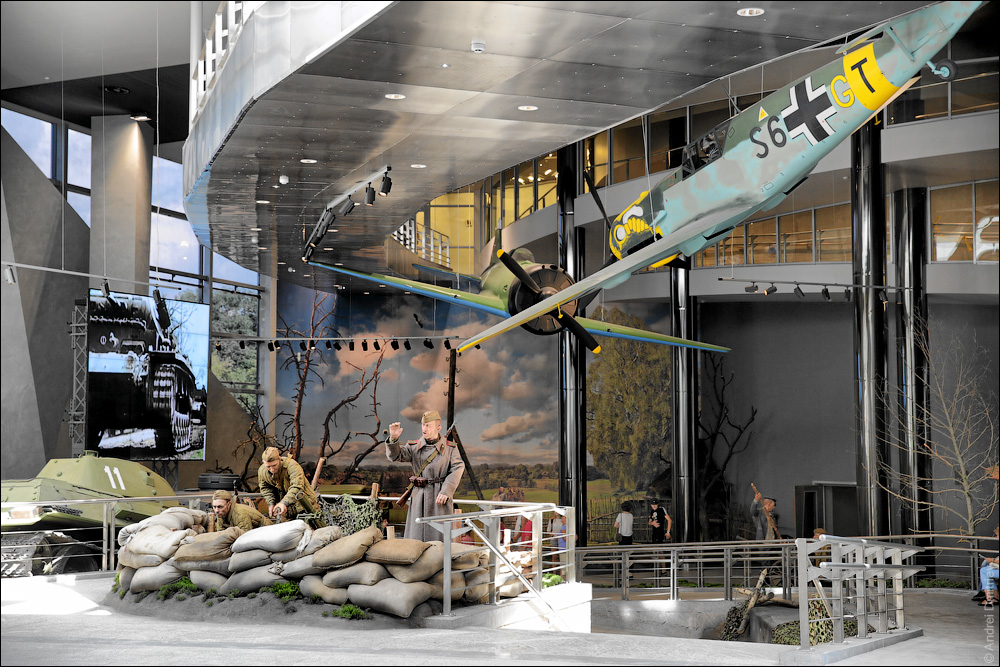

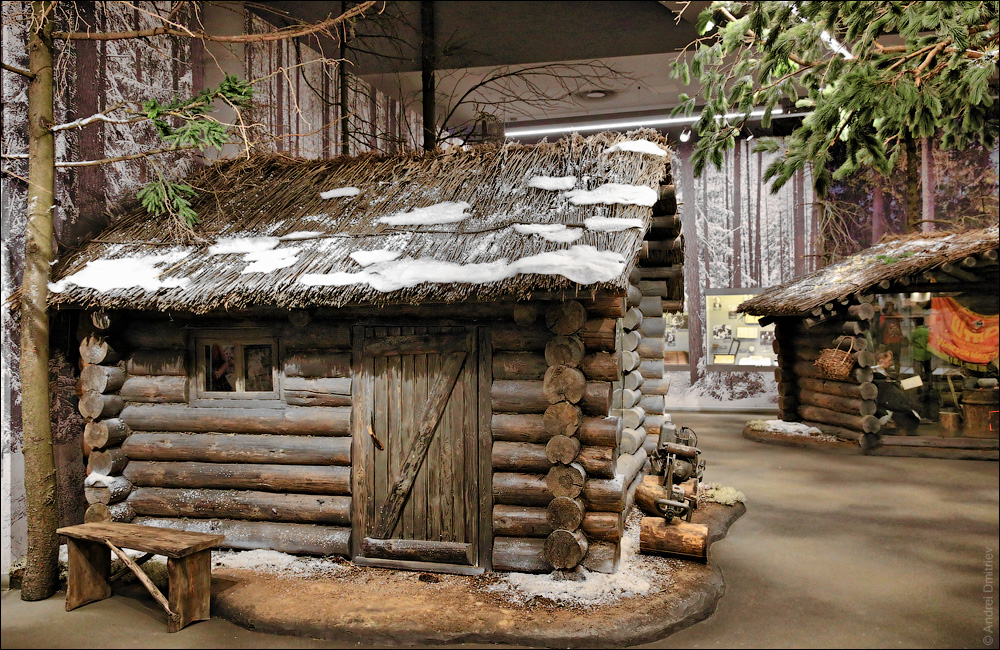

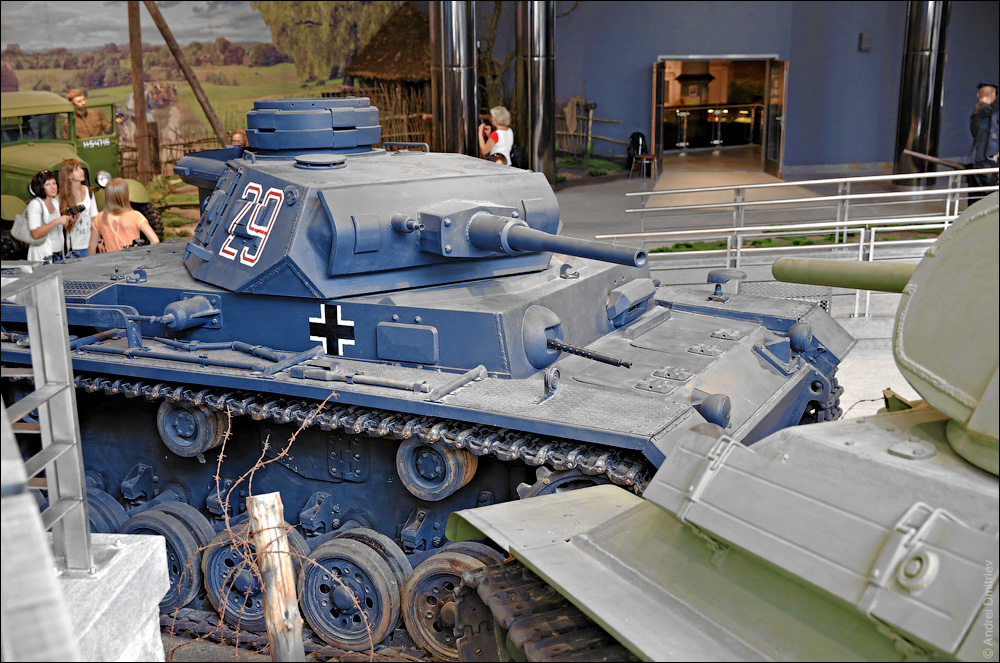

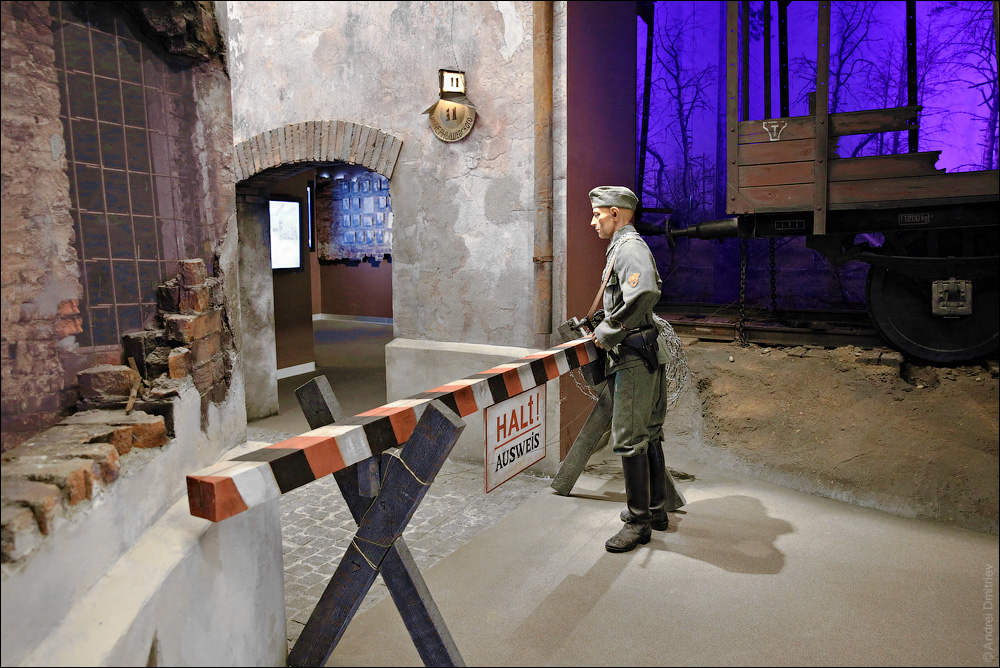

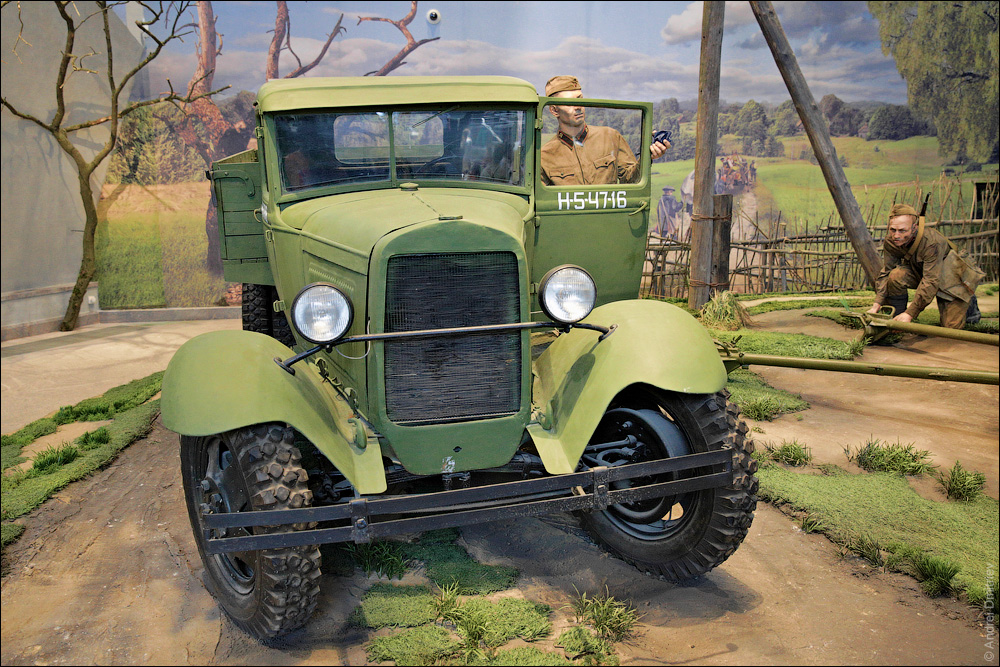

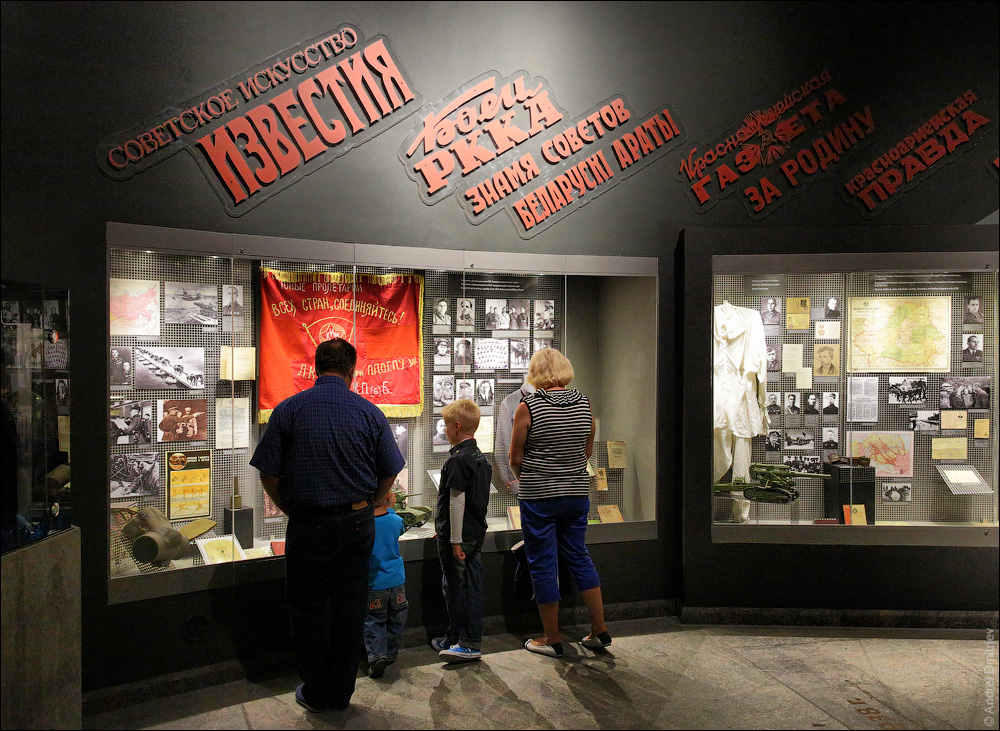

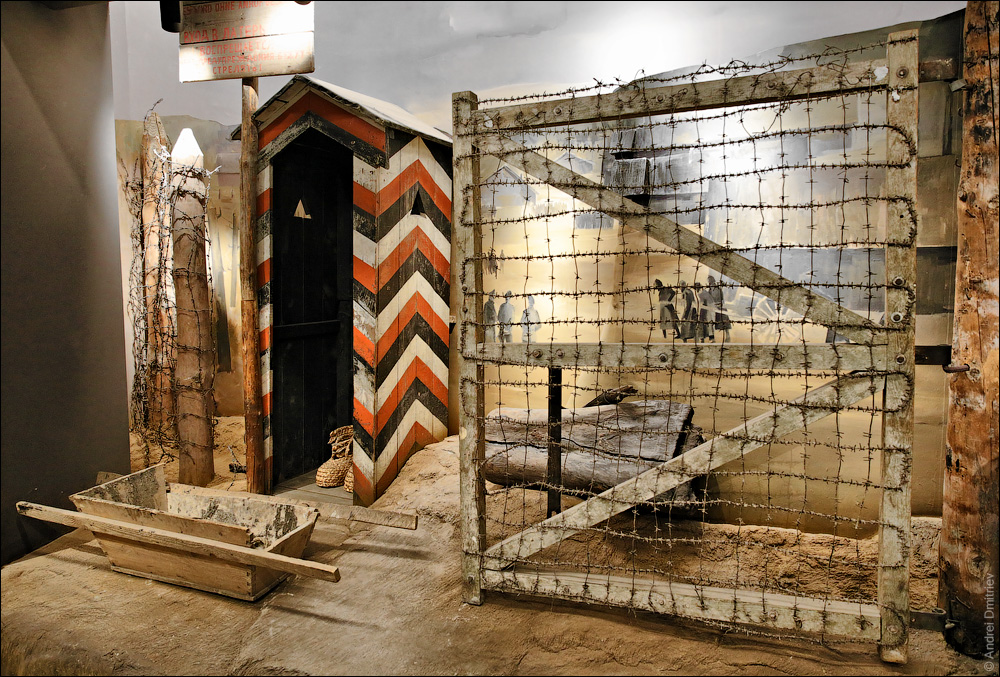

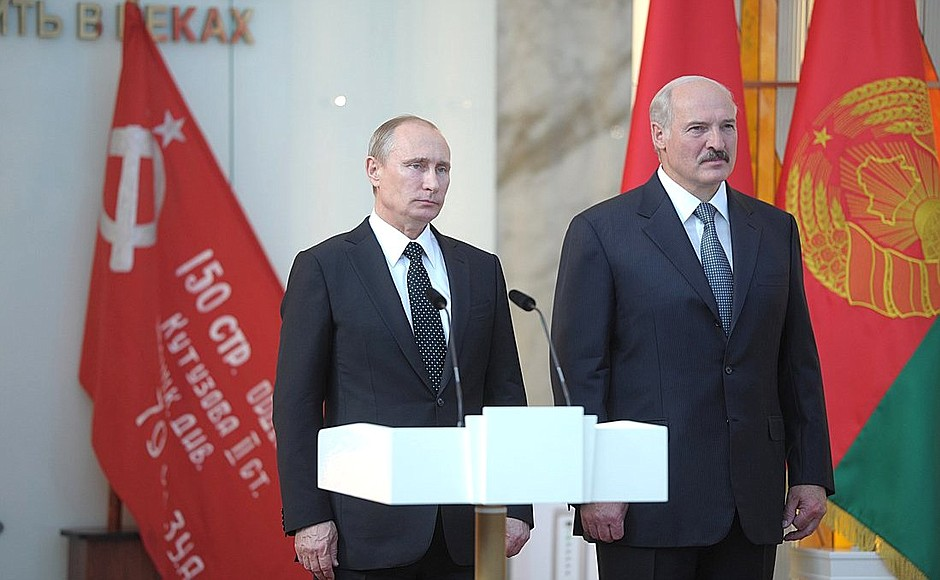
Vladimir Putin and Alexander Lukashenko attending the inauguration of a new building in the museum in 2014.
