= Timeline of Minsk =

The following is a timeline of the history of the city of Minsk, Belarus.

== Prior to 19th century ==
- 1066 – Vladimir the Great, Prince of Kiev, devastates the town.
- 1067 – The Battle on the Nemiga River occurs near Minsk.
- 1101 – Gleb Vseslavich becomes the prince of Minsk.
- 1104 – Town besieged by Kiev forces.
- 1115 – Town besieged by Kiev forces again.
- 1129 – Town becomes part of Kievan Rus'.
- 1242 – Town becomes part of Grand Duchy of Lithuania.
- 1413 – Minsk becomes part of the Vilnius Voivodeship.
- 1441 – City charter granted.
- 1499 – Magdeburg rights granted.
- 1505 – City besieged by Crimean Khanate army.
- 1508 – City besieged by Muscovy forces.
- 1552 – Town privileges extended.
- 1566 – City becomes capital of Minsk Voivodeship.
- 1569 – City becomes part of Polish–Lithuanian Commonwealth.
- 1591 – Minsk coat of arms granted.
- 1616 – Basilian monastery, Minsk founded.
- 1642 – Holy Spirit Cathedral (Minsk) built.
- 1654 – Russo-Polish War (1654–1667): City occupied by the Russians.
- 1667 – City restored to the Polish–Lithuanian Commonwealth.
- 1673 – Church built at Kalvaryja.
- 1685 – Yeshiva founded.
- 1708 – Great Northern War: City occupied by the Swedes.
- 1709 – Great Northern War: City occupied by the Russians.
- 1710 – Jesuit church built.
- 1775 – 3rd Lithuanian Infantry Regiment stationed in Minsk.
- 1789 – 1st Lithuanian National Cavalry Brigade stationed in Minsk.
- 1790 – 1st Lithuanian National Cavalry Brigade relocated from Minsk to Kiejdany.
- 1791 – 4th Lithuanian Infantry Regiment relocated from Borysów to Minsk.
- 1792 – 4th Lithuanian Infantry Regiment relocated from Minsk to Słuck.
- 1793
  - City annexed by the Russian Empire following the Second Partition of Poland.
  - Orthodox Diocese of Minsk (Belarusian Orthodox Church) established.
- 1796 – City becomes capital of Minsk Governorate.
- 1798 – Catholic diocese of Minsk formed.

== 19th century ==
- 1801 – Independence Avenue (Minsk) opened, then called Zahariy Street
- 1805 – Governor's Garden established.
- 1808 – Kalvaryja cemetery in use (approximate date).
- 1812
  - Napoleon in power.
  - November: Russian forces oust the French.
- 1821 – Population: 2,000 (approximate).
- 1825 – Pischalauski Castle built, now a prison.
- 1827 – Population: 3,000 (approximate).
- 1831 – Polish November Uprising.
- 1836 – Alexander Square, Minsk established.
- 1837 – Fire brigade in operation.
- 1838 – Minskiye gubernskiye vedomosti newspaper begins publication.
- 1840 – Military Cemetery established.
- 1844 – Theatre opens.
- 1845
  - Public library established.
  - Population: 20,000 (approximate).

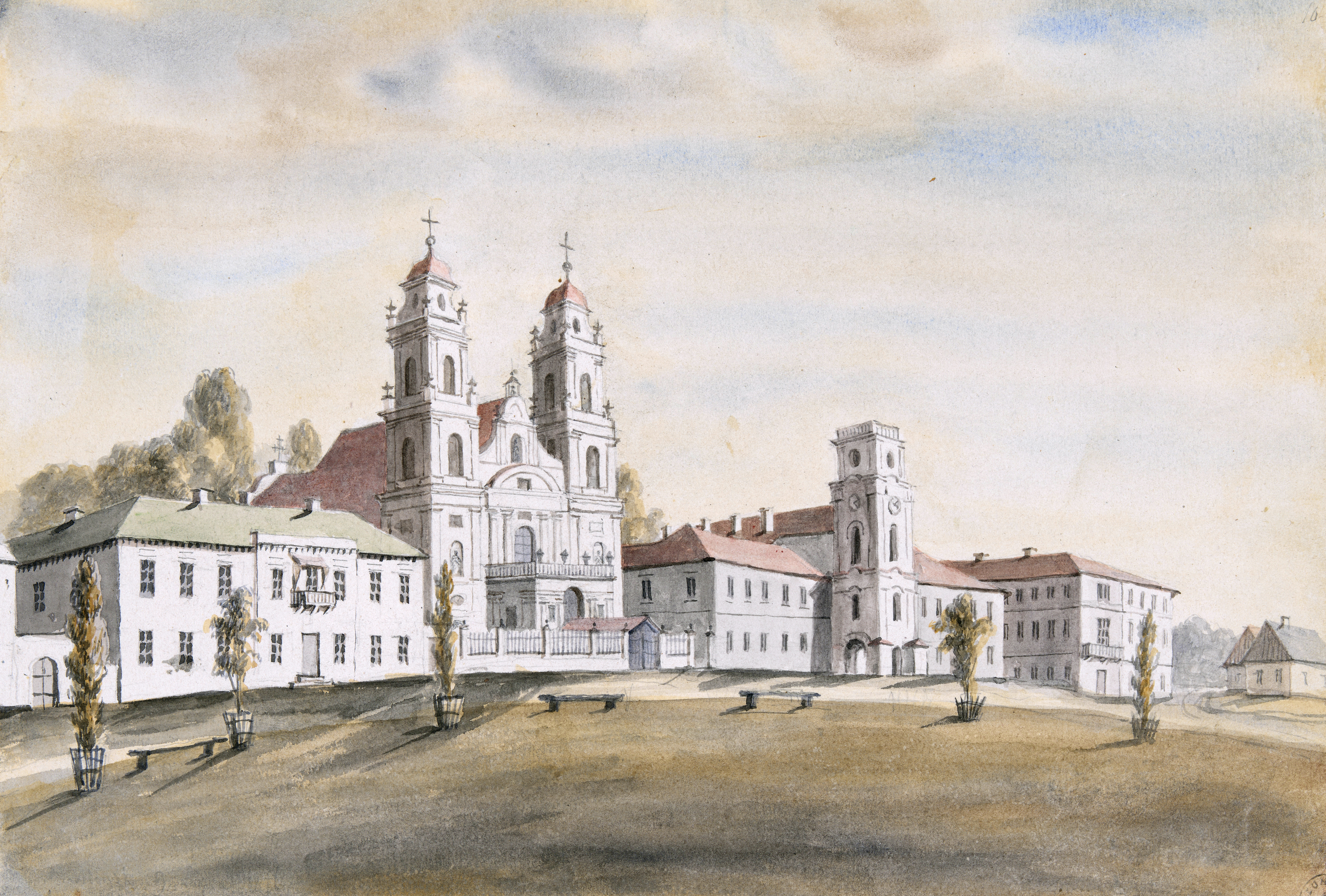
19th-century painting of the Catholic Cathedral and former Jesuit College in Minsk

- 1846 – Moscow-Warsaw road laid out.
- 1857 – Greek Catholic Cathedral of Saints Peter and Paul rebuilt.
- 1860 – Population: 27,000.
- 1864 – Church of Holy Trinity consecrated.
- 1871 – Minsk railway station opened.
- 1872 – Municipal water supply introduced.
- 1873 – Vilnius railway station built.
- 1882 – Population: 53,328.
- 1886 – Minskiy Listok newspaper begins publication.
- 1890 – Kupala Theatre opens.
- 1892 – Horse tram begins operating.
- 1897 – Population: 91,494.
- 1898 – Russian Social Democratic Labour Party founded in Minsk.

== 20th century ==
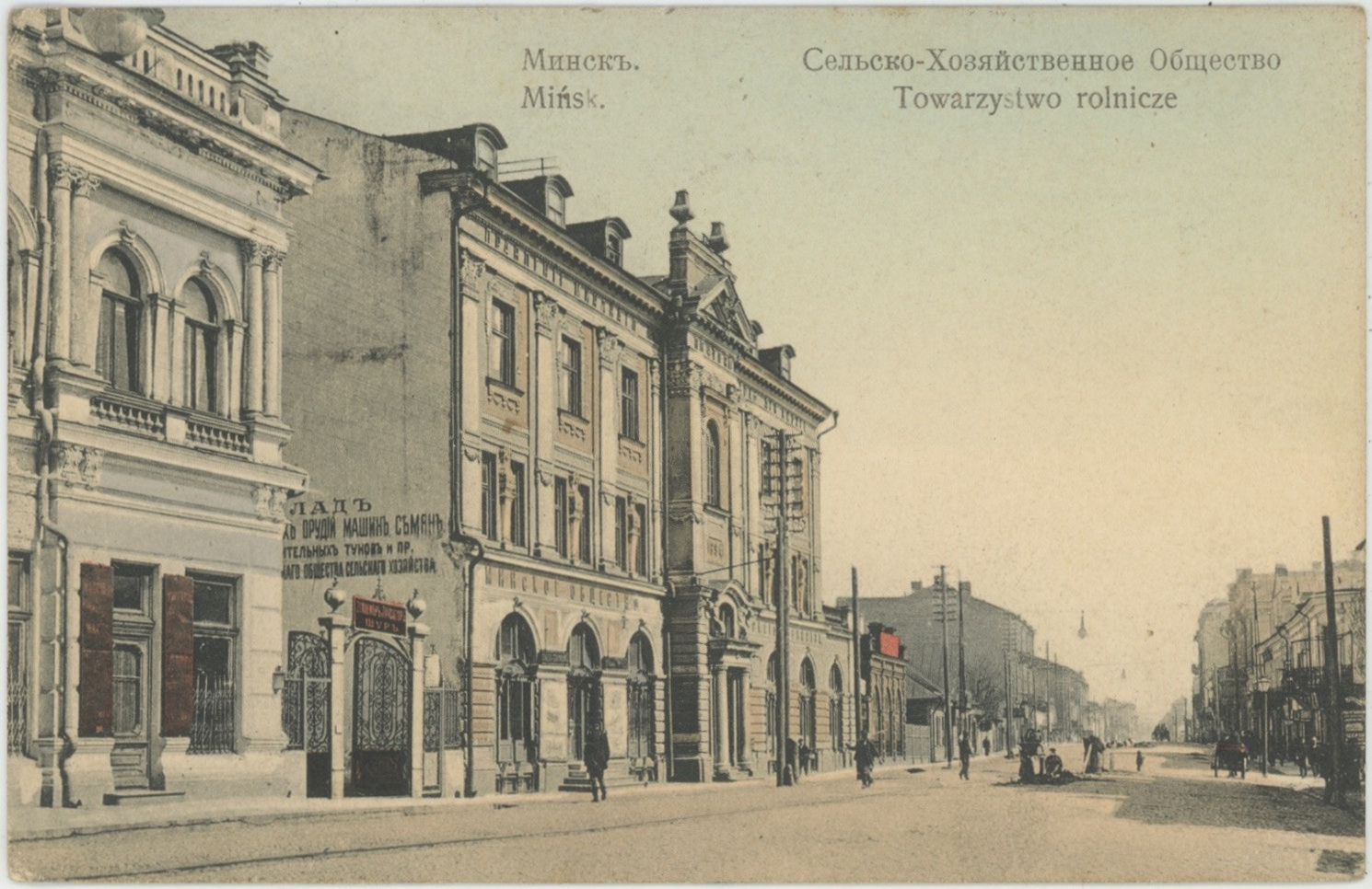
Minsk in 1909

=== 1900s–1940s ===
- 1902 – "All-Russian Congress of Zionists" held in Minsk.
- 1910 – Church of Saints Simon and Helena consecrated.
- 1911 – Tolstoy library founded.
- 1913 – Population: 117,600.
- 1914 – Minsk teachers institute founded.
- 1917
  - November: "Bolshevik troops arrive in Minsk."
  - December: First All-Belarusian Congress meets in city.
- 1918
  - February: German forces oust Bolsheviks.
  - 25 March: "First All-Belarusian Congress declares independence of the Belarusian Democratic Republic."
- 1919
  - 8 January: City becomes capital of Byelorussian Soviet Socialist Republic.
  - August: City captured by Polish troops during Operation Minsk, part of the Polish–Soviet War.
- 1920
  - July: Soviet forces take city.
  - Belarusian State Polytechnic Institute established.
  - Theatre opens.
- 1921
  - Aleksandrovsky, Lyakhovsky, and Central administrative districts created.
  - Belarusian State University established.
  - City hosts first All-Belarusian Conference of Librarians.
- 1923 – Museum of the First Congress of the Russian Social Democratic Workers' Party founded.
- 1924 – Consulate-General of Poland established.
- 1926 – January: City hosts first Congress of Belarusian Archeologists and Archeographers.
- 1927 – Sovetskaya Belorussiya newspaper begins publication.
- 1929 – Electric tram begins operating.
- 1930 – Minsk State Medical Institute founded.
- 1931 – Belarusian Young Spectators' Theatre established.
- 1932 – Belarusian State Conservatory, Minsk Botanical Garden, and Kamaroúski Park established.
- 1933
  - Minsk-1 Airport begins operating.
  - Opera and Ballet Theatre and Belarusian Institute for National Economy established.
- 1934
  - Dynama Stadium built.
  - Government House, Minsk completed.
- 1937 – Kurapaty death camp begins operating near city.
- 1938 – Kaganovich, Stalin, and Voroshilov administrative districts created.
- 1939
  - Soviet Belarus film studio relocates to Minsk.
  - National Opera and Ballet of Belarus building opens.
  - Belarusian State Art Gallery established.
  - Population: 238,948.

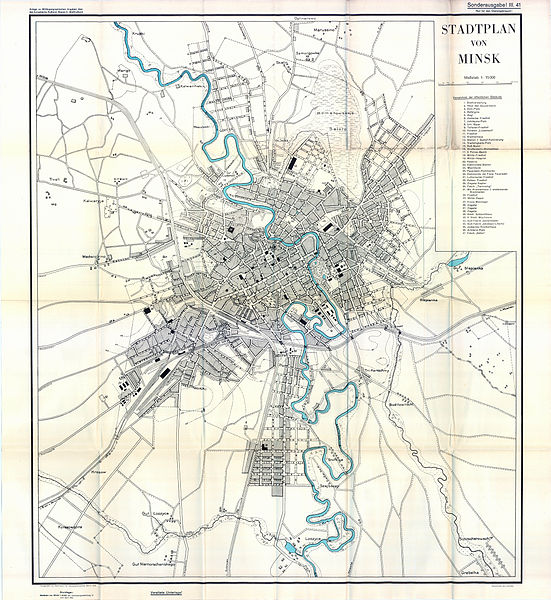
Map of Minsk, 1941

- 1940 – Soviet executions of Polish officers and intelligentsia during the Katyn massacre.
- 1941
  - June: Bombing of Minsk.
  - June 28: German occupation begins.
  - July 17: Reichskommissariat Ostland established.
  - July 20: Minsk Ghetto established.
  - Dulag 126 and Dulag 127 transit camps for prisoners of war based in Minsk.
  - August: Forced labour camp for Jews established.
  - Stalag 352 prisoner-of-war camp established by the Germans.
  - October: Some 8,000 POWs from Stalag 352 executed.
- 1942
  - February: 925 POWs executed at Stalag 352.
  - May: Maly Trostenets extermination camp in operation.
  - August: 600 POWs executed at Stalag 352.
- 1943 – State Archive for Film established.
- 1944
  - June: Stalag 352 camp evacuated westwards.
  - 4 July: Red Army takes city.
  - Minsk Automobile Plant established.
  - Belarusian Great Patriotic War Museum opens.
  - Zvyazda newspaper in publication.
- 1945 – Belarus Theatrical Institute founded.
- 1946
  - Minsk Tractor Works established.
  - Belarusian Institute of Technology relocates to Minsk.
- 1948 – Minsk Institute for Foreign Languages founded.

=== 1950s–1990s ===
- 1950
  - Yanka Kupala Park and Pobieda Kino (cinema) established.
  - Tarpeda Stadium built.
  - Belarusian State Puppet Theatre active.
- 1954
  - Minsk Wheeled Tractor Plant founded.
  - Victory Square monument erected.
- 1955
  - Children's Railroad opens.
  - Vasily Ivanovich Sharapov becomes mayor.
- 1957 – Belarusian State History Museum established.
- 1959
  - Minsk Refrigerator Plant established.
  - Population: 509,667.
- 1961 – October Square, Minsk construction completed.
- 1963 – MKAD (Minsk) ring road constructed.
- 1964 – Radioengineering Institute established.
- 1967 – Vecherniy Minsk newspaper begins publication.
- 1968 – Stadium of the VSS Red Banner opens.
- 1970
  - Belarusian State Musical Comedy Theatre active.
  - Population: 917,428.
- 1971 – Belarus Optical & Mechanical Enterprise founded.
- 1979
  - Belarusian History Museum opens.
  - Population: 1,333,000.

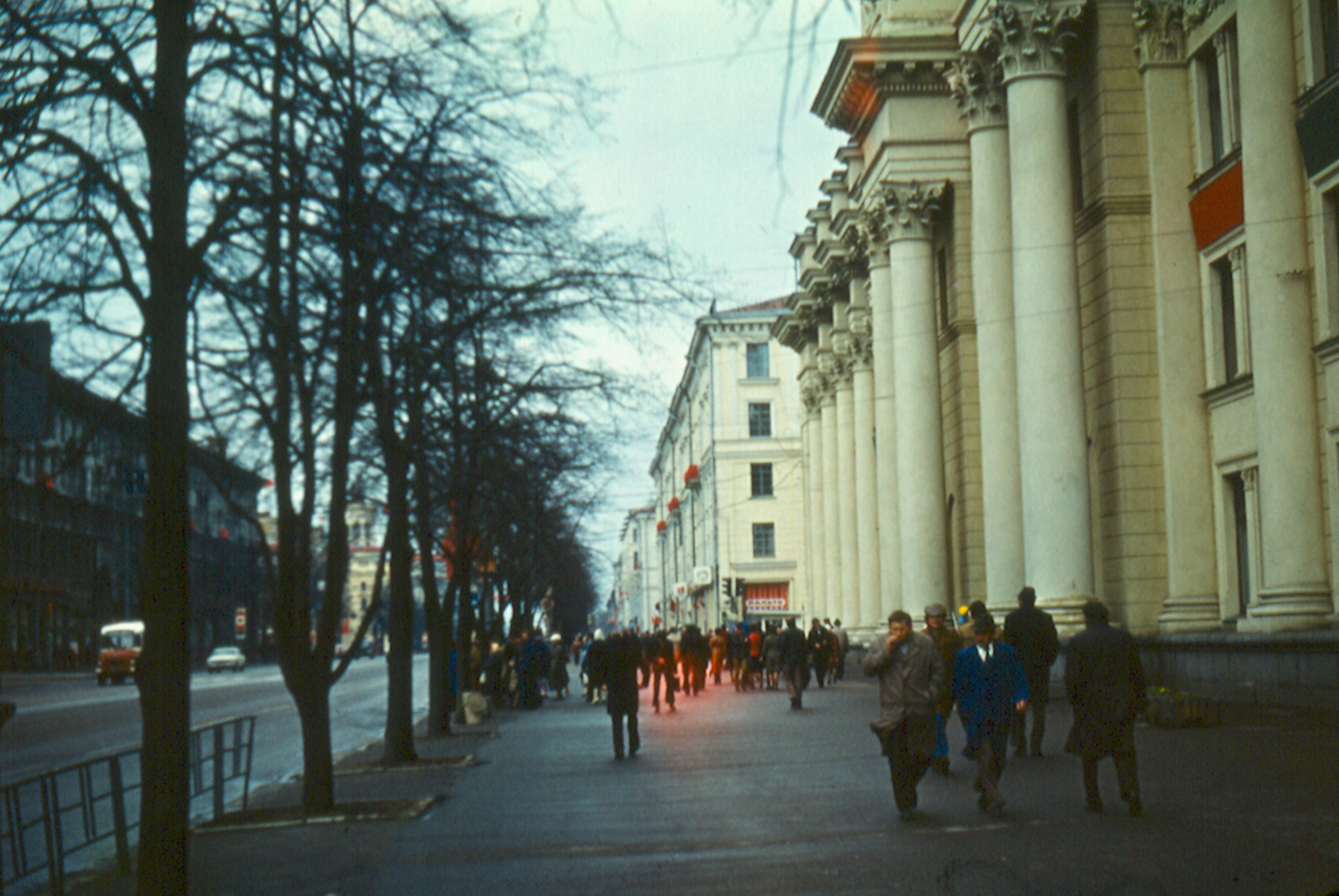
Minsk in 1981

- 1981 – Biennial puppet festival begins.
- 1982 – Minsk National Airport begins operating.
- 1984
  - Minsk Metro begins operating.
  - Minsk Zoo opens.
- 1988 – 30 October: Demonstration; crackdown.
- 1989
  - 19 February: "Rally of 'informals.'"
  - 30 September: Environmental protest.
  - 1989 – Population: 1,607,077.
- 1990 – Public Library of the City of Minsk established.
- 1991
  - April: Labor strike.
  - City becomes capital of Republic of Belarus.
  - City "becomes the headquarters of the successor to the Soviet Union, the Commonwealth of Independent States."
  - State Security Committee of the Republic of Belarus (KGB HQ) formed.
  - Belarusian Nature and Environment Museum and Academy of Public Administration founded.
- 1992 – International Sakharov Environmental University and Republican Institute for Vocational Education established.
- 1993
  - July: Belarusians of the World congress held in city.
  - Listapad (Minsk International Film Festival) begins.
- 1994 – Polish Institute in Minsk established.
- 1995 – Vladimir Yermoshin becomes mayor.
- 1996
  - November: "Chernobyl march."
  - National Academic Bolshoi Ballet Theatre of the Republic of Belarus and National Academic Opera Theatre of Belarus formed.
- 1999
  - 30 May: Nyamiha metro disaster.
  - Moscow bus station (Minsk) built.
- 2000
  - 15 March: Political demonstration held.
  - Mikhail Pavlov becomes mayor.
  - Darida Stadium opens.

== 21st century ==
=== 2000s ===
- 2001 – March: Anti-Lukashenko demonstration.
- 2002
  - Minsk Passazhirsky railway station and Football Manege arena built.
  - MKAD (Minsk) ring road rebuilt.
  - Independence Square, Minsk reconstruction completed.
  - October: Library of the Polish Institute in Minsk established.
- 2004
  - Kurapaty monument installed.
  - IIHF World U18 Championships held.
- 2005 – 14 May: Water féerie demonstration.
- 2006
  - March: Jeans Revolution.
  - November: Summit of Commonwealth of Independent States.
  - National Library of Belarus building opens.
- 2007 – March: Anti-Lukashenko demonstration.
- 2008 – 4 July: Bombing.
- 2009 – Ў Gallery founded.

=== 2010s ===
- 2010
  - December: Post-election demonstration.
  - Minsk-Arena opens.
  - Nikolai Aleksandrovich Ladutko becomes mayor.
  - Junior Eurovision Song Contest 2010 held.
- 2011
  - 11 April: Metro bombing.
  - Protests against Lukashenko regime.
- 2012
  - 4 July: Teddy bear airdrop.
  - Population: 1,901,700.
- 2014
  - May: 2014 Ice Hockey World Championship held in city.
  - Andrei Shorets becomes mayor.
  - Population: 1,921,807 city; 2,101,018 metro.
- 2015 – 12 February: International meeting produces ceasefire agreement ("Minsk II") related to the War in Donbas.
- 2018 – Junior Eurovision Song Contest 2018 held.
- 2019 – Minsk hosts the 2019 European Games.

=== 2020s ===
- 2020–2021 Belarusian protests after elections

== See also ==
- History of Minsk
  - Timeline of Minsk governance
  - Timeline of technology in Minsk
  - Minsk population growth
- History of Minsk with timeline (in Belarusian Taraškievica)
- List of mayors of Minsk

== Bibliography ==
- William Henry Overall, ed. (1870). "Minsk, Russia". Dictionary of Chronology. London: William Tegg. hdl:2027/uc2.ark:/13960/t9m32q949.
- "Minsk", New International Encyclopaedia, New York: Dodd, Mead, 1905
- "Minsk", Jewish Encyclopedia, vol. 8, New York, 1906, hdl:2027/osu.32435029752870
- "Minsk (town)" . Encyclopædia Britannica. Vol. 18 (11th ed.). 1910. p. 556.
- "Minsk". Russia. Leipzig: Karl Baedeker. 1914. OCLC 1328163.
