= List of museums in Belarus =

This is a list of museums in Belarus.

- Belarusian Great Patriotic War Museum
- Belarusian National Arts Museum
- Belarusian National History and Culture Museum
- Belarusian Nature and Environment Museum
- Berestye Archeological Museum
- Brest Railway Museum
- Gomel Palace
- Maksim Bahdanovič Literary Museum
- Marc Chagall Museum
- Old Belarusian History Museum
- Tower of Kamyanyets
- Virtual Museum of Soviet Repression in Belarus
- Vitebsk Museum of Modern Art
- Vitebsk regional museum

== See also ==
- List of museums
- Culture of Belarus
