= Caveat =

Caveat may refer to

Latin phrases:

- Caveat lector ("let the reader beware")
- Caveat emptor ("let the buyer beware")
- Caveat venditor ("let the seller beware")

Other:

- CAVEAT, a Canadian lobby group
- Caveat, an album by Nuclear Death
- Caveat (film), a 2020 horror film
- Caveat, a rural locality west of Mansfield, Australia
- Caveat (horse) (fl. 1983)
- Classified information in the United States#Handling caveats
- A moratorium on probate, especially in Common Law jurisdictions
- Caveat (property law)

== See also ==
- Paulette Caveat, attempt to enjoin development in northern Canada
- Patent caveat, former type patent-related action
- National caveats, restrictions on military operations put in place by NATO member countries regarding the use of their military forces
- Reservation (law), a caveat to a state's acceptance of an international treaty
