= Eyes only =

Jargon for handling of classified information

Eyes only is jargon used with regard to classified information. Whereas a classified document is normally intended to be available to readers with the appropriate security clearance and a need to know, an "eyes only" designation, whether official or informal, indicates that the document is intended only for a specific set of readers. As such the document should not be read by other individuals even if they otherwise possess the appropriate clearance. Another meaning is that the document is under no circumstances to be copied or photographed, "eyes only" meaning that it is to be physically read by cleared personnel and nothing more, to ensure that no unauthorized copies of the text are made which might be unaccounted for.

EYES ONLY may be used as part of the national caveats in English-speaking countries, as an addition to the security classification. The caveat designates assets of particular sensitivity to, say, the UK, or where dissemination is restricted to individuals from specific foreign nations. Unless explicitly named, information bearing a national caveat will not be sent to foreign governments, overseas contractors or international organisations or released to any foreign nationals.

British regulations require notices on the document to specify a level of classification ("TOP SECRET", e.g.) and a "caveat", separated by a hyphen, e.g., "TOP SECRET – UK / US EYES ONLY" and centered horizontally on the page.
