= Paulette Caveat =

Attempt to enjoin development in northern Canada

The Paulette Case refers to the filing of a legal caveat concerning the different interpretations of Treaty 8 and Treaty 11 between the Government of Canada and the Denesoline in the Northwest Territories (NWT).

In 1973, Fort Smith Chief Francois Paulette, along with sixteen NWT chiefs, attempted to file a caveat in Yellowknife, Northwest Territories, to gain a legal interest in 400,000 square miles (1,000,000 km^{2}) of land in the Northwest Territories. The chiefs claimed the land, by virtue of their aboriginal rights, and sought to prevent the construction of the proposed Mackenzie Valley Pipeline.

The territorial government referred the caveat to the Supreme Court of the Northwest Territories. Justice William Morrow, the only sitting judge of that court at the time, held a six-week hearing process to establish whether signatories of Treaty 8 and Treaty 11 had fully understood the meaning of the treaties they had signed in 1900 and 1921 respectively. Hearings were held in a number of communities in the Northwest Territories (some only accessible by plane), with some hearings being held in informal settings.

Many witnesses testified that the Denesoline signatories did not believe that Treaty 8 and Treaty 11 extinguished their Aboriginal rights to the land and that the treaties were unfulfilled. Justice Morrow agreed with these witnesses and ruled that the chiefs had established a case for claiming Aboriginal rights sufficiently to warrant the filing of a caveat.

Although the ability to register the caveat was overturned by the Supreme Court of Canada, Justice Morrow's findings in respect to Aboriginal rights were not overturned.

The Paulette case resulted in the initiation of the Dene/Metis comprehensive land claim process. The Paulette and Calder cases prompted the Government of Canada to hold public hearings on the proposed Mackenzie Valley Pipeline (hearings that become known as the Berger Inquiry).
