= 2006 Riga NATO summit =

2006 NATO summit meeting in Riga, Latvia

Riga summit
- Riga summit logo
- Host country: Latvia
- Dates: 28–29 November 2006
- Venues: Olympic Sports Centre

The 2006 Riga summit was a NATO summit held in the Olympic Sports Centre, Riga, Latvia from 28 to 29 November 2006. The most important topics discussed were the War in Afghanistan and the future role and borders of the alliance. Further, the summit focused on the alliance's continued transformation, taking stock of what has been accomplished since the 2002 Prague Summit. NATO also committed itself to extending further membership invitations in the upcoming 2008 Bucharest Summit. This summit was the first NATO summit held on the territory of the Baltic states.

== Security measures ==
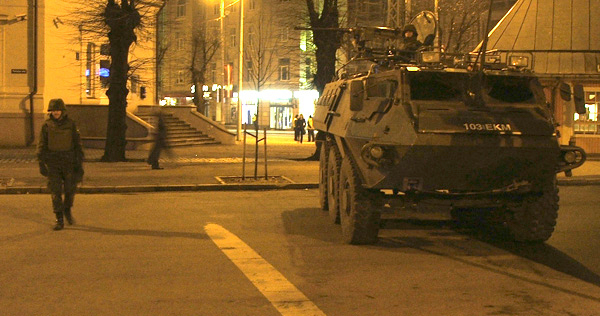
Security measures in the streets of Riga.

The summit was held in the Olympic Sports Centre, Riga. Roads in the center of Riga were closed down and parking was not allowed at the airport or at several roads, out of fear of car bombs. About 9000 Latvian police officers and soldiers took care of the Summit's security, while more than 450 other airmen from seven European NATO countries were called upon to ensure a no-fly zone above the summit in an operation called Operation Peaceful Summit. This enhanced ongoing Baltic Air Policing activities with additional aircraft, communications and maintenance support.

== Summit ==
All agreements were not actually made in the North Atlantic Council meeting, but in fact, it was made in the Istanbul Summit, 2003, except for the signing of the missile defense contract which happened on 28 November. The Council meeting was held on 29 November.

=== Main topics ===
While the tensions between NATO members from the build-up to the invasion of Iraq had dissipated, the NATO summit, and the months preceding the summit, were marked by divisions between the United States and the United Kingdom on the one side and France, Germany, Italy and Spain on the other. Two rifts existed, one about the military contributions to the war in Afghanistan, and the other concerning whether or not NATO should assume a more global role.

==== War in Afghanistan ====
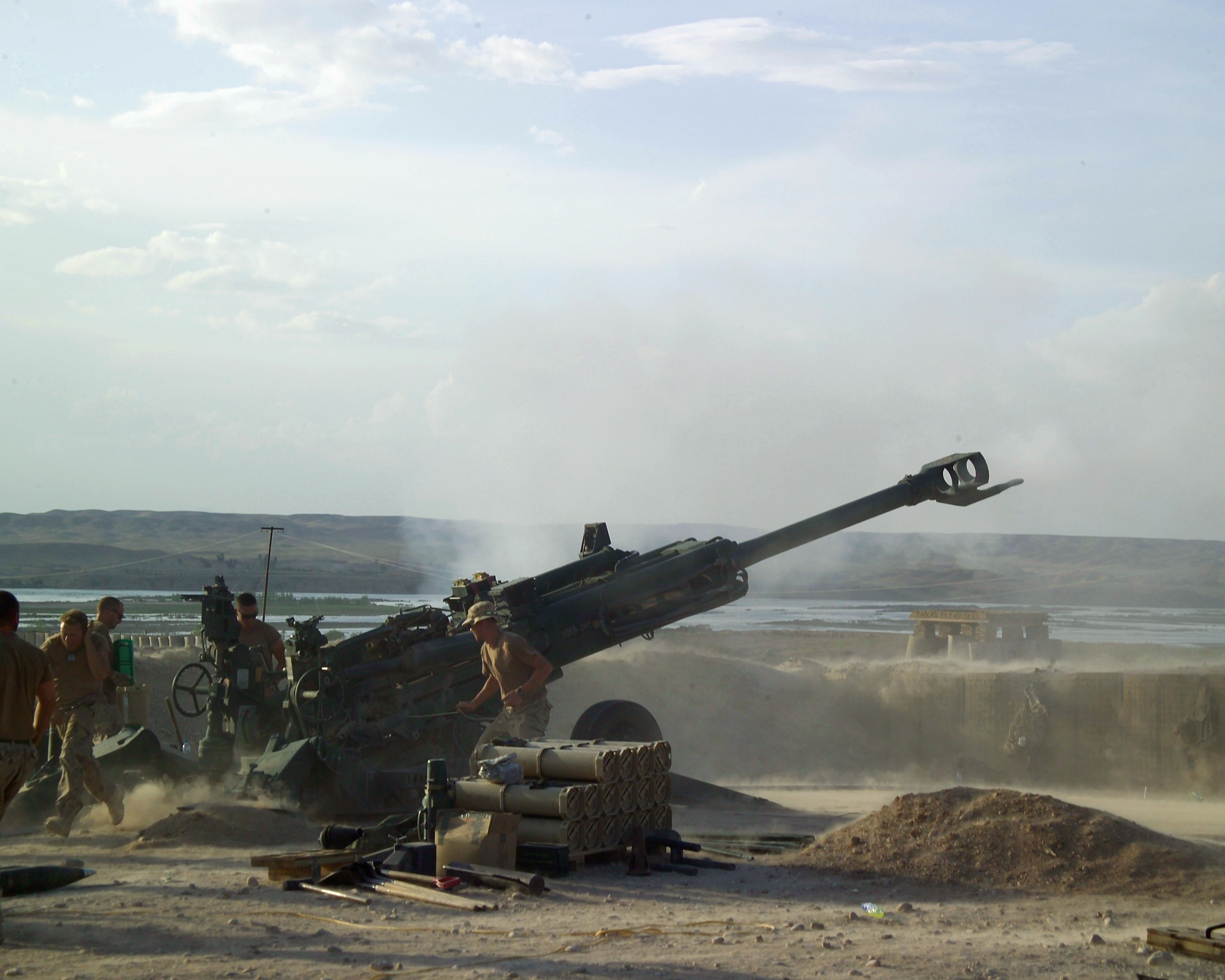
Canadian forces in Helmand province, Afghanistan. The need for more troops in the south of the country was a major discussion point of the summit

Before and during the summit US president George W. Bush, British prime minister Tony Blair, Canadian prime minister Stephen Harper and Dutch Prime Minister Jan Peter Balkenende made a plea to European NATO members to make more troops available for deployment in Afghanistan, remove the national caveats (i.e. national restrictions on how, when and where forces can be used) and start sending its troops into the conflict-ridden south of the country. According to Supreme Allied Commander Europe (SACEUR) General James L. Jones it was not the lack of combat troops and the caveats were the problem, but the lack of adequate helicopters and military intelligence to support airlift and on-the-ground operations.

While the NATO countries in question refused to participate in the fighting in the south, they agreed to remove some of these national caveats, and in an emergency situation, all national caveats should cease to exist, meaning that every ally should come to the aid of the forces that require assistance. A number of NATO member states also pledged to provide additional assets, including fighters, helicopters, infantry companies as well as training teams that will mentor the Afghan National Army. NATO Secretary General Jaap de Hoop Scheffer said that the removal of some of the caveats meant that some 20,000 of the 32,000 NATO troops in ISAF are made "more usable" for combat duties and that 90% of the formal mission requirements were now filled. Military sources, however, told reporters at the summit that these caveats never existed in emergency situations, adding that it would be a strange alliance where one country's soldiers refused to support their allies in an emergency. NATO leaders also backed a French proposal to set up a "contact group" to coordinate action concerning Afghanistan, but the United States had reservations about France's proposal to include Iran, which has considerable influence over the west of Afghanistan, in the proposed contact group due to the dispute over Iran's nuclear programme. The group was modelled on the one set up for the Yugoslav Wars in the 1990s.

Political scientist Joseph Nye commented that "while the Riga summit relaxed some of these caveats to allow assistance to allies in dire circumstances, Britain, Canada, the Netherlands, and the US are doing most of the fighting in southern Afghanistan, while French, German, and Italian troops are deployed in the quieter north. It is difficult to see how NATO can succeed in stabilizing Afghanistan unless it is willing to commit more troops and give commanders more flexibility." The controversy surrounding the differences in contributions to Afghanistan indeed remained after the summit. For instance, in March 2007, British commanders accused the NATO members that refused to fight in the conflict-ridden south (in non-emergency situations) of causing "huge resentment" and a sense of betrayal and undermined the credibility of the alliance. They added that despite the earlier pleas for reinforcements or to have "operational caveats" removed, some countries, notably France and Germany, were still not heeding their requests.

Besides the above discussion about contributions and caveats, the summit was noticed to paint an optimistic picture of the war in Afghanistan and Afghanistan's future. For instance, NATO Secretary-General Jaap de Hoop Scheffer said that "real progress" had been made in Afghanistan and that this was the main highlight of the summit. He strongly disagreed with visions of "doom and gloom," and added that five years after the defeat of the Taliban regime, Afghanistan had become a democratic society that is "no longer a threat to the world." He also believed that the defeat of the insurgency was only a matter of time, stating that the war in Afghanistan "is winnable, it is being won, but it is not yet won because, of course, we have many challenges in Afghanistan." In his opinion, these challenges included besides military engagement mainly reconstruction and development work.

==== Role of NATO ====
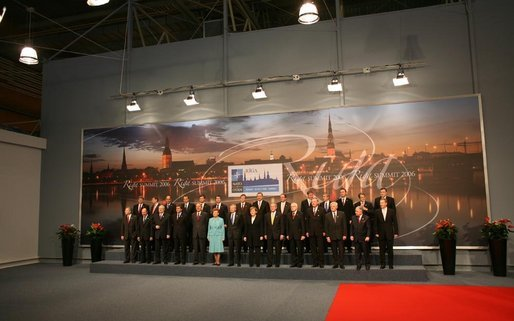
NATO heads of state and government stand for the official portrait at the 2006 NATO Summit.

The second, more fundamental rift, concerned a discussion about whether NATO should form close relationships with countries far beyond NATO's borders, in particular Australia, Japan and South Korea. The United States and some other NATO members pressed for a closer relationship with these countries. R. Nicholas Burns, Under Secretary for Political Affairs explained the US proposal: "We seek a partnership with them so that we can train more intensively (...) and grow closer to them because we are deployed with them. Australia, South Korea and Japan are in Afghanistan. They have all been in Iraq (...) [and] in the Balkans." It was however not clear how far this plan would have gone in practice, but the US insisted they were not seeking to turn NATO into a global alliance: membership would not be offered to the prospective new partners. The idea of a "global" NATO however was strongly opposed by France, which considers NATO a regional defense alliance that should not spread its wings too far over the globe. The French Defence Minister Michele Alliot-Marie summarized the position of France as follows: "The development of a global partnership could... dilute the natural solidarity between Europeans and North Americans in a fuzzy entity [and it would] send a bad political message, that of a campaign launched by the West against those who don't share their ideas. What a pretext we would offer to those who promote the idea of a clash of civilisations." The summit did not reach a satisfying consensus on the future role of NATO and it was considered an exercise in "papering over cracks", much more than it was ever a serious effort to decide on the future borders and core purposes. As a consequence, the debate continued after the summit.

=== Other topics ===
==== Kosovo ====
At the Riga summit, NATO members confirmed the role of NATO-led KFOR in ensuring a stable security environment there. This is perceived to be a reference to the possible United Nations decision in favour of independence. Because Serbia strongly opposes the break-away of Kosovo, the resulting tensions between Serbia and Kosovo could create instability in the region.

==== Enhanced cooperation with non-members ====
Enhanced cooperation with non-member states closer at home was less controversial and two offers were made: an extension of Partnership for Peace membership, and a training initiative.

- Partnership for Peace (PfP) membership was offered to Bosnia and Herzegovina, Montenegro and Serbia. NATO hoped that this would bring these countries more into the Euro-Atlantic community as the PfP is a programme of practical bilateral cooperation between individual Partner countries and NATO, thereby allowing Partner countries to choose their own priorities for cooperation. It is expected that PfP membership is for these three countries the first step towards NATO membership. As a result, the PfP offer sparked the anger of the UN tribunal trying suspected war criminals from the Balkans.
- NATO launched a Training Cooperation Initiative offering to share NATO training expertise with its Mediterranean Dialogue (MD) countries (Mauritania, Morocco, Algeria, Tunisia, Egypt, Israel and Jordan) and Istanbul Cooperation Initiative (ICI) countries. The initial phase included expanding those countries' participation in relevant existing NATO training and education programmes, and the establishment of a Middle East faculty at the NATO Defense College in Rome. As a second phase, NATO would consider supporting the establishment of a Security Cooperation Centre in the region, to be owned by the MD and ICI countries, with regional funding and NATO assistance. Senior NATO staff have tended to highlight this project as evidence of NATO's forward-thinking and its desire to avoid becoming a party to a "clash of civilizations".

==== Comprehensive Political Guidance ====
Comprehensive Political Guidance (CPG), a policy document that had been agreed upon by Defence Ministers in June 2006 and an addition to the 1999 Strategic Concept document, was formally endorsed during the summit. The CPG intends to provide a framework and political direction for NATO's continuing transformation in the coming 10 to 15 years. More specifically, the document expresses the belief that the principal threats to the Alliance in the coming decades are terrorism, proliferation, failing states, regional crises, misuse of new technologies, and disruption of the flow of vital resources. According to this document, the Alliance should adapt to these new threats and set out the Alliance vis-a-vis capability issues, planning disciplines and intelligence for the next 10 to 15 years, including among others the need for joint expeditionary forces and the capability to deploy and sustain them over long periods of time. The document further underlined that NATO's forces should be able to conduct a variety of missions, from high to low intensity, and emphasized the likelihood that NATO will need to carry out a greater number and range of smaller operations. The CPG also confirmed the principle that 40% of the member states' military forces must be re-deployable, and 8% must constantly be on operations abroad. This principle makes it, among other things, possible to effectively compare the contributions made by various states, irrespective of the size of their populations.

The CPG policy document is regarded as self-contradictory for at least two reasons. Firstly, it identified the two greatest threats to NATO as terrorism and the proliferation of weapons of mass destruction (WMD), whilst simultaneously reaffirming the 1999 Strategic Concept as "remaining valid" despite the fact that it barely mentioned these threats. Secondly, the document states that collective defence remains the core purpose of NATO, but at the same time emphasizes potential NATO contributions to conflict prevention and crisis management, and the potential planning and management of missions like that in Afghanistan. The Riga Declaration even described the capability for such missions as NATO's "top priority". Additionally, Jaap de Hoop Scheffer wanted and expected a new Strategic Concept to be debated and agreed upon by 2008, reinforcing already existing views that the CPG will most likely last much less than the 10 to 15 years as the guiding policy document.

==== Energy security ====
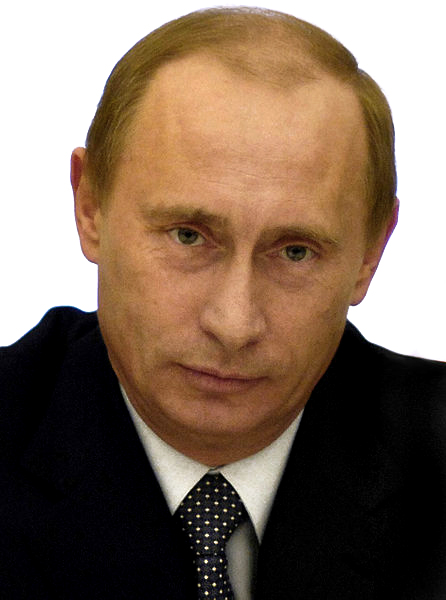
There was debate over the reasons for Vladimir Putin's absence from the conference

The Riga summit was the first NATO summit that underscored the need for energy security, following the Russia-Ukraine gas dispute. The "Riga Summit Declaration" (par. 45) stated that "Alliance security interests can also be affected by the disruption of the flow of vital resources" and that it supported "a coordinated, international effort to assess risks to energy infrastructures and to promote energy infrastructure security." It further states that NATO leaders "direct the Council in Permanent Session to consult on the most immediate risks in the field of energy security, to define those areas where NATO may add value to safeguard the security interests of the Allies and, upon request, assist national and international efforts." Radio Free Europe reports that an unnamed diplomatic source told that several NATO leaders, including Latvian president Vaira Vike-Freiberga, had tried to make arrangements for bilateral talks concerning this topic with Russian president Vladimir Putin during the summit, but Putin instead attended the CIS energy summit in Minsk, Belarus on 28 November 2006. In contrast, The Independent reported that the summit was marred by a diplomat fracas over an invitation to President Vladimir Putin and that he was eventually not invited, and that Putin as a result threatened that he would visit Latvia for the first time since independence during the summit to upstage the summit. It was even proposed that Putin could honour French president Jacques Chirac, who was at the summit and whose 74th birthday coincided with the summit, by visiting Latvia. He later made clear that this would not go ahead.

==== 2008 membership invitations ====
The NATO Heads of State and Government congratulated the efforts of the three Balkan states currently in NATO's Membership Action Plan: Albania, Croatia and Macedonia, and declared that the Alliance intends to extend further invitations to these countries during the 2008 Bucharest Summit, on condition that these countries meet NATO standards. The Alliance also affirmed that NATO remained open to new European members under Article X of the North Atlantic Treaty, but remained largely silent on the prospects of Georgia and Ukraine, two countries that had declared membership as a goal, as the summit limited itself to noting the efforts of both countries to conduct an "intensified dialogue" with NATO. Nevertheless, Estonian Prime Minister Andrus Ansip said after the summit that he had discussed Georgia's membership with US president Bush on 28 November. He further added that in his view Georgia had "very good chances" to join NATO if the planned reforms would continue and that a Membership Action Plan, the next necessary step on Georgia's way towards membership, was only "a small step away". Preceding the summit, it was expected that Ukraine was on a fast track to membership: it was believed that Ukraine would have received an invitation to a Membership Action Plan during the summit, followed by an invitation to join in 2008 and membership in 2010. According to political scientist Taras Kuzio the summit showed that Georgia rapidly moved ahead of Ukraine in its drive to join NATO, even though it joined the Intensified Dialogue program a year later than Ukraine, because president of Ukraine Viktor Yushchenko failed to support a pro-Western Orange revolution coalition following the Ukraine's parliamentary elections of March 2006. In other words, Ukraine showed more ambivalence in its desire to join NATO, whereas in Georgia the pro-Western Rose Revolution coalition remained united.

==== NATO Response Force ====
NATO Secretary-General Jaap de Hoop Scheffer announced that the NATO Response Force was finally fully operational since all capabilities necessary were in place. The force is believed to be capable of performing missions worldwide across the whole spectrum of operations (such as evacuations, disaster management, counterterrorism, and acting as "an initial entry force") and can number up to 25,000 troops and should be able to start to deploy after five days' notice and sustain itself for operations lasting 30 days or longer if resupplied. The heads of state and government also agreed to share the costs of airlift for the short notice deployments of the Response Force.

==== 2010 Theatre Missile Defence ====
In September 2006, NATO selected an international consortium led by Science Applications International Corporation (SAIC) to build an Integration Test Bed for the Alliance's future Active Layered Theatre Missile Defence (ALTBMD) capability. After two months of negotiations, ALTBMD Programme Manager, General (Ret) Billard, and SAIC contracting Officer, Mr. Robert Larrick, signed the contract on the first day of NATO's Riga Summit. This decision was based on an unpublished report agreed upon earlier by NATO ministers following a study into the feasibility of theatre missile defences.

This programme is one of three programmes that NATO is pursuing in the area of missile defence. The contract puts the Alliance on track for having, by 2010, a system to protect troops on missions against ballistic missiles. The contract is worth approximately 75 million EUR for work that would be conducted over a period of six years. The theatre missile defence would be a multi-layered system of systems, comprising early warning system sensors, radar and various interceptors. While NATO member countries would provide the sensors and weapon systems, NATO itself would develop a commonly funded NATO architecture to integrate all of these elements. The development of the ALTBMD system was agreed by NATO members in large part because it is limited. NATO members are deeply divided about the multi-tiered BMD architecture promoted by the US Missile Defense Agency (MDA).

== Views on the summit ==
For the three formerly post-Soviet states of Latvia, Estonia and Lithuania such a high-level event was held for the first time in the region. As a consequence, it held symbolic meaning. It is perceived to have increased the visibility of these three Baltic states as NATO members.
