= History of Minsk =

History of the capital city of Belarus

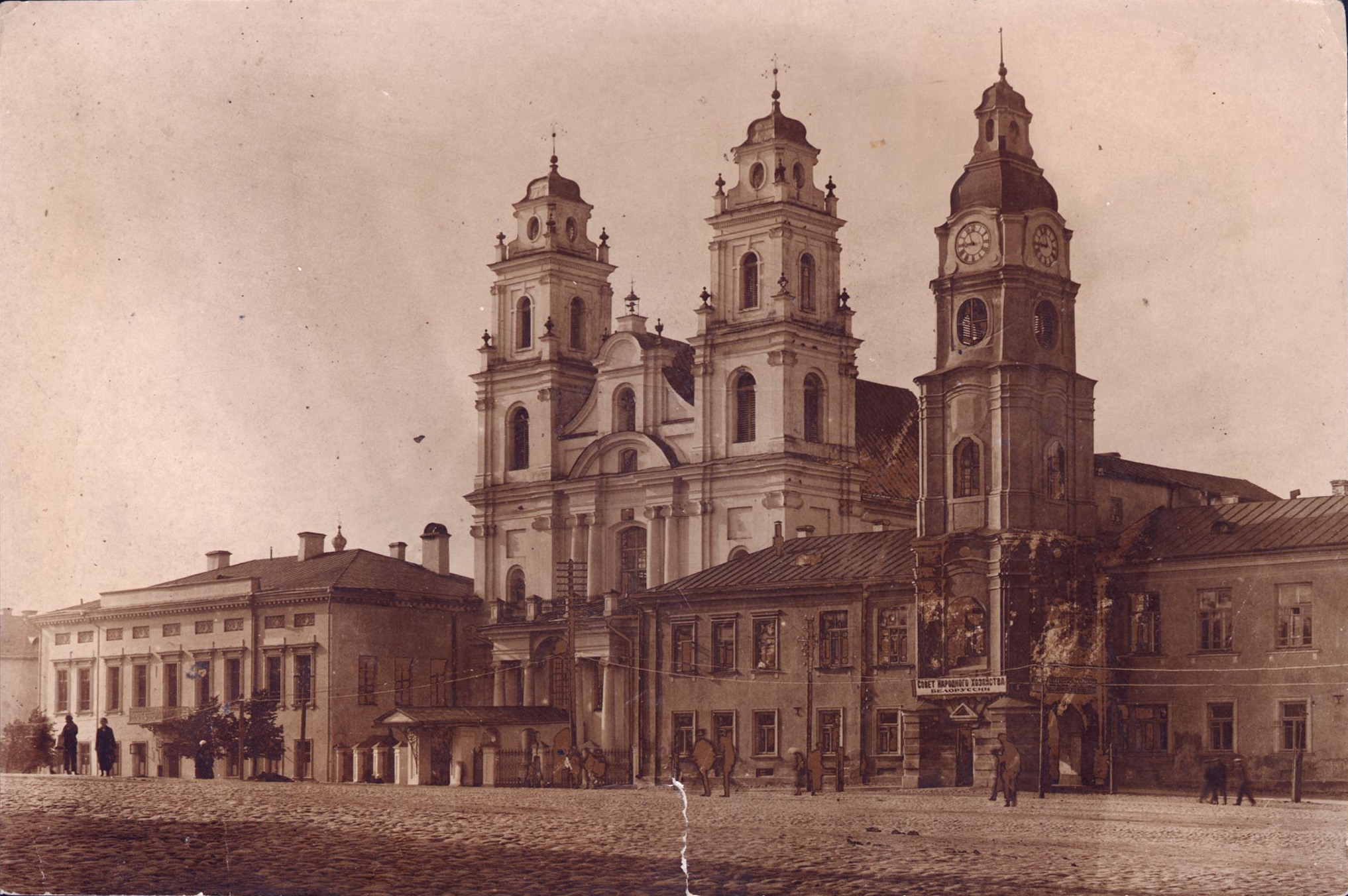
Minsk in 1928

The history of Minsk spans around 1000 years with the city first recorded in 1067.

Early East Slavs settled the forested hills of today's Minsk by the 9th century. They had been migrating from further south and pushing the preceding Balts northwards. The valley of Svislach river was settlement boundary between two Early East Slavs' tribal unions – Krivichs and Dregovichs. By 980 the area was incorporated into the early medieval Principality of Polatsk, one of the earliest East Slav states along with the principalities of Kiev and Novgorod. From 1101, it was the capital of an eponymous principality. From 1242 it formed part of the Grand Duchy of Lithuania, since 1386 in the Polish–Lithuanian union, and from 1569 it was part of the Polish–Lithuanian Commonwealth. With the Partitions of Poland, it passed to Russia, then was contested by several entities following World War I, eventually becoming the capital of the Byelorussian Soviet Socialist Republic, and of modern Belarus since 1991.

== Overview ==
There is no exact historical record for the date when Minsk was founded. It was first mentioned (as Mensk) in the Primary Chronicle in 1067. That year the chronicle recorded a bloody battle between troops of Polatsk and Kiev princes on the banks of Niamiha river (tributary of Svislach). Minsk, which was a Principality of Polatsk town, was burnt down by the Kievan army during a war between Kiev and Polatsk. 1067 is now widely attributed as a founding year of Minsk, though the town (by then fortified by wooden walls) should have existed for some time before it could have been burnt down. Some historians believe, that Minsk evolved from an earlier village, which may have been founded as early as the 9th or 10th centuries. Recent archeological excavations support this idea.

There is a theory that Minsk was initially located 16 km to the southwest, on the banks of Menka river. According to this view, Kievan troops first seized the town and then marched to the mouth of the Niamiha, the location of a small fort, where the chronicled battle occurred. Later, the fort was rebuilt and renamed Mensk.

There are several theories on the origin of the name.

1. The settlement on the banks of Menka river to the southwest of today's Minsk. Remnants of a 10th-century settlement on the banks of the Menka were found by archeologists in the 1930s.
2. There is a legend of a giant man with a name Menesk who lived in the area and gave the name to a settlement.
3. The city name comes from the Slavonic word "мена" ("miena" – "barter" or "trade" in English"), as Minsk initially served as a trading settlement around a marketplace. However, it is less likely, as Slavs rarely used names for trade or craft for their towns. Most towns and cities have been named after rivers or governing princes.
4. Niamiha river may have had another name then, possibly Meniha. This would explain why a settlement on its banks would be named Mensk.

== Governance timeline ==
5th century–8th century	To tribal union of Dregovichs
8th century–9th century	To tribal union of Krivichs
870–882	To Novgorod
882–972	To Kiev
972–980	To Novgorod
980–980	To Kiev
10th century–1101	To Principality of Polatsk
1101–1129	To Principality of Minsk
1129–1146	To Principality of Kiev
1146–1242	To Principality of Minsk
1242–1569	To Grand Duchy of Lithuania
1569–1654	To Polish–Lithuanian Commonwealth
1654–1667	Under Russian occupation
1667–1708	To Polish–Lithuanian Commonwealth
1708–1709	Under Swedish occupation followed by Russian occupation
1709–1793	To Polish–Lithuanian Commonwealth
1793–1812	To Russian Empire
1812–1813	Under French occupation
1813–1917	To Russian Empire
1918–1918	Under German occupation
1918–1919	To Belarusian People's Republic
1919–1919	To Byelorussian SSR
1919–1920	Under Polish occupation
1921–1941	To Byelorussian SSR, since 1922 in the Soviet Union
1941–1944	Under German occupation
1944–1991	To Byelorussian SSR, constituent republic of the Soviet Union
1991—	To Belarus

== Early history ==
After the town was rebuilt after the 1067 battle, it was located 100–150 to the south of Niamiha and Svislach confluence. It was centred on a wooden fort, surrounded by a flooded ditch and by an earth mound. This area of Minsk later evolved into Zamchyshcha, or 'Citadel'. It included a church and several living quarters. In the later years Minsk grew southwards on the right bank of Svislach. Outside the town walls craftsmen and traders were building wooden houses along narrow streets with wooden flooring. Trading settlement formed the Nizhni Rynak ('Lower Market') quarter, now area around Niamiha metro station.

In the early 12th century Principality of Polatsk disintegrated into smaller fiefs. Principality of Minsk was established by one of the Polatsk dynasty princes. First Prince of Minsk was Hleb Usiaslavavich (died in 1119), who expanded the town and built its first stone church (reconstructed basement of the Church of Virgin Mary is now unearthed and can be found near Svislach embankment). During Prince Hleb's reign Minsk was twice besieged (in 1104 and in 1115) by troops of Kiev and other principalities, but withstand the invaders.

In 1129 Principality of Minsk was annexed by Kiev, the dominant city of Kievan Rus', however in 1146 the Polatsk dynasty regained control of the principality. By 1150 Minsk has rivaled Polatsk as the major city in the former Principality of Polatsk. Princes of Minsk and Polatsk were engaged in years of struggle trying to unite all lands previously under the rule of Polatsk.

== In the Grand Duchy of Lithuania ==
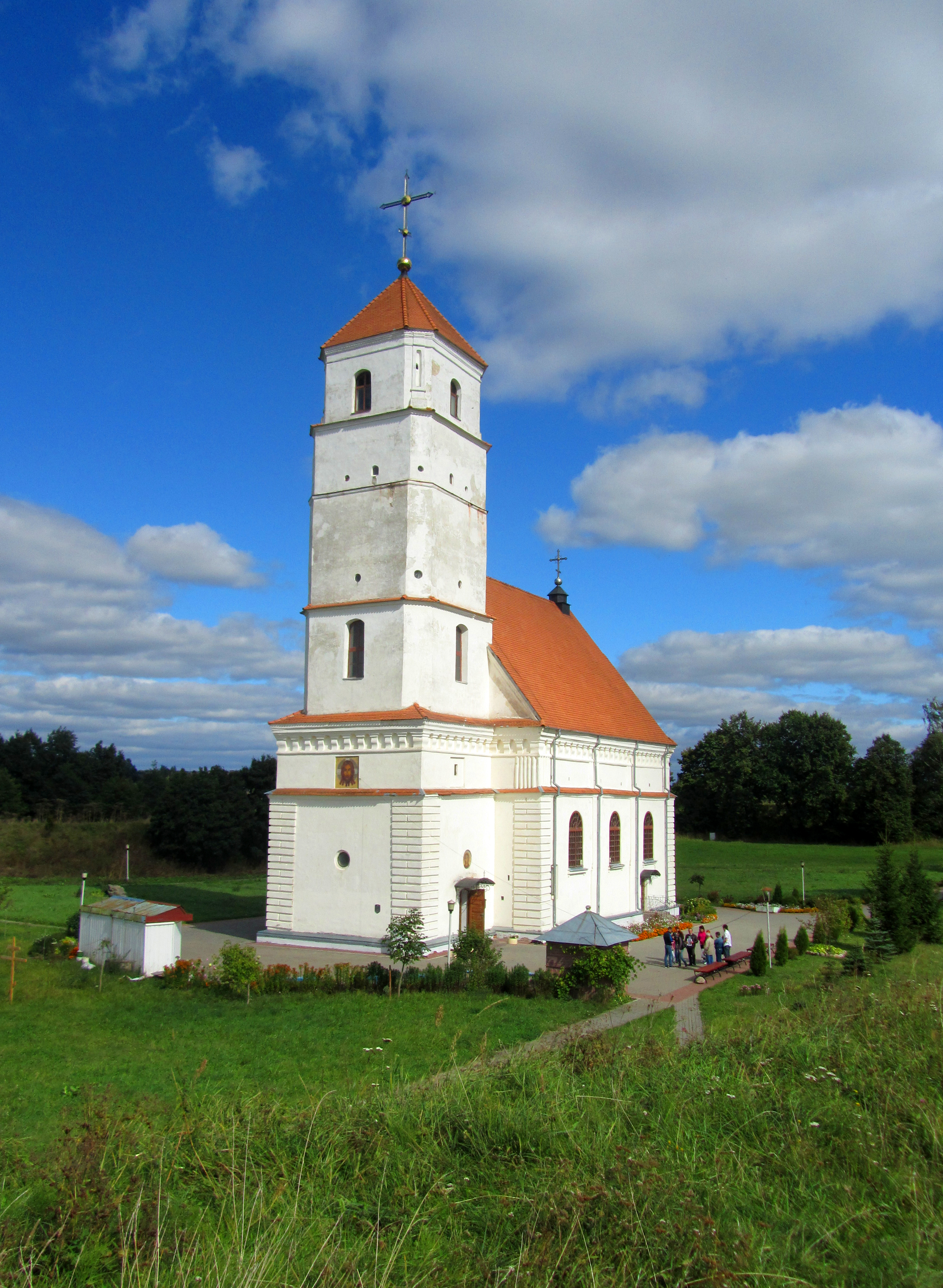
The Saviour Church (1577) is part of an archaeological reservation in Zaslavl, 23 km (14 mi) northwest of Minsk

Minsk escaped the Mongol invasion of Rus in 1237–1239. However, in later years it was attacked by nomadic invaders from the Golden Horde, who turned many principalities of disintegrated Kievan Rus' into their vassal states. Trying to avoid the Tatar yoke, the Principality of Minsk sought protection from Lithuanian princes to the west, who had been consolidating their power in the region. In 1242 Minsk became a part of the expanding Grand Duchy of Lithuania. It was annexed peacefully and local elites enjoyed high ranking in the society of the Grand Duchy. For instance, a treaty between Lithuania and the Novgorod Republic was signed for Lithuanian Prince Gediminas by Vasily, the then ruler of Minsk.

In 1441 Lithuanian prince Casimir IV Jagiellon included Minsk into a list of cities enjoying certain privileges. During the reign of his son Aleksander Jagiellon Minsk received its town privileges (Magdeburg law) in 1499. The city was governed by a magistrate headed by an appointed governor, usually an influential local landlord.

By 1450 Minsk was among 15 largest cities of the Grand Duchy of Lithuania with about the population of 5,000. It was an important and wealthy trading city profiting from its favourable location. It was on the ancient trading roads connecting Smolensk and Moscow in the east to Poland and Central Europe in the west, and linking Novgorod and Vilnius in the north and northwest respectively with Ukraine. Historical records suggest that Minsk contributed large sums to the treasury of the Grand Duchy.

Minsk was often a target for foreign invasions. In 1505 it was raided by Crimean Khanate army, in 1508 besieged by the troops of Muscovy, who also raided the vicinity of Minsk in 1514 and 1519. To restore the wealth of the city, Sigismund II Augustus extended town privileges in 1552, allowing trade fairs, and transferred some agricultural lands around the city to Minsk.

=== In the Polish–Lithuanian Commonwealth ===
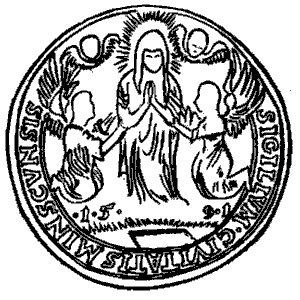
Seal of Minsk from 1591

In 1569 after the Union of Lublin the Grand Duchy of Lithuania and Kingdom of Poland merged into the Polish–Lithuanian Commonwealth, while still maintaining themselves as two separate entities legally, militarily and socially. Since then, a Polish community settled in Minsk – government clerks, officers and craftsmen.

By the middle of the 16th century, Minsk was an important economic and cultural centre of the Polish–Lithuanian Commonwealth. The city contained several guilds of craftsmen and was an important trading centre. Minsk merchants exported wood, tar, wax, blacksmith's work, glass, skins and furs. They brought in salt, wine, spices, fabrics and metals. Minsk had a thriving merchant port on Svislach river, which connected the city with Kiev and Smolensk.

Minsk was an important centre for Eastern Orthodox Church and boasted seven Orthodox religious brotherhoods. After the Union of Brest there was a rise of influence of both Uniate church and Roman Catholic Church. They were wealthier under the Polish rule and received funding for building new monasteries and churches. In the 16th century Minsk was an important cultural centre with schools and printing works. It was also in this time that Jews began the settle in the city. In 1591 Minsk received its first coat-of-arms, depicting Virgin Mary and the angels. By the early 17th century Minsk had some stone houses in Verkhni Horad (Uppert Town) and was surrounded by new earth mound with stone fortifications. There were two suburbs outside the city walls – Traetskae suburb on the left bank of the Svislach and Rakauskaye suburb to the west of the city, on the trading route to Vilnius and Warsaw.

In 1654 Minsk was conquered by troops of Tsar Alexei of Russia. Russians governed the city until 1667, when it was regained by the King of Poland and Grand Duke of Lithuania John II Casimir Vasa. By the end of the Deluge, Minsk had only about 2,000 residents and just 300 houses. Other cities and towns of Lithuania were also heavily devastated by the war. The second wave of devastation occurred during the Great Northern War when Minsk was occupied in 1708 and 1709 – by the Swedish army of Charles XII and then by the Russian army of Peter the Great. Minsk paid large retributions to both foreign armies.

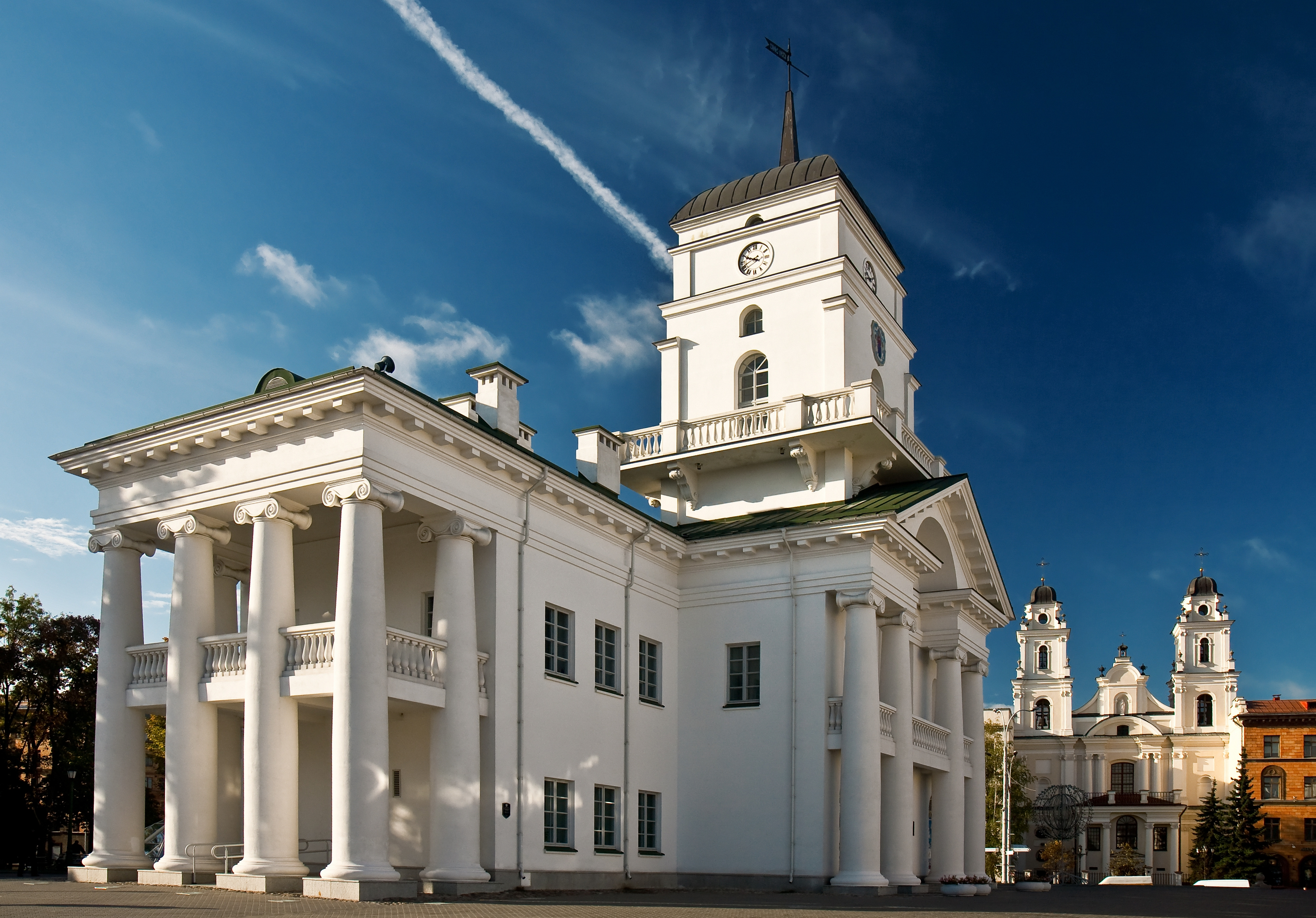
Minsk city hall

The last decades of the Polish-Lithuanian rule were indicated by decline or very slow development. Minsk was a small provincial town of little economic or military significance. By 1790 it had population of 6,500–7,000 and was slowly rebuilding to the city limits of 1654. In 1785 the city magistrate was also complemented with an elected city council. Most of Minsk residents were Jews and Poles, while Belarusians were a minority. There was also a small minority of Belarusian-speaking Tartars living in Tatarskaya Slabada to the northwest of the then city limits.

== Russian rule ==
Minsk was annexed by Russia in 1793 as a consequence of the Second Partition of Poland. In 1796 it became centre of the Minsk Governorate (province). All Polish street names were changed to Russian ones, however spelling of the city's name remained unchanged.

In 1805 a municipal garden was established by the Minsk governor for the enjoyment of local residents. By 1811 Minsk had about 11,000 residents. Its development was interrupted by Napoleon's invasion of Russia in 1812. During the French occupation there was a struggle between the Polish and Belarusian elites for the control of the city. Poles strove for a revival of the Kingdom of Poland while Belarusians hoped for their national homeland. By the end of the French occupation Minsk had only 3,500 residents and large parts of the city were completely destroyed during the fighting between the French and the Russian armies.

In 1830 was one of the centres of the November Uprising in the former Grand Duchy of Lithuania. After 1831, the use of Belarusian and Polish languages has been banned, and Russian was the only official language. In 1835 Minsk was officially included into the Pale of Settlement, which later led to a rise in Jewish population. Throughout the 19th century the city grew and significantly improved. In the 1830s major streets and squares of Minsk were cobbled and paved. A first public library was opened in 1836, a fire brigade was put into operation in 1837. In 1838 first local newspaper, Minskie gubernskie vedomosti ("Minsk province news") went into circulation. First theatre was established in 1844. By 1850 Minsk had a dozen of schools and two colleges. By 1860 Minsk was an important trading city with population of 27,000. There was a construction boom which led to building 2- and 3-storey brick and stone houses in Upper Town.

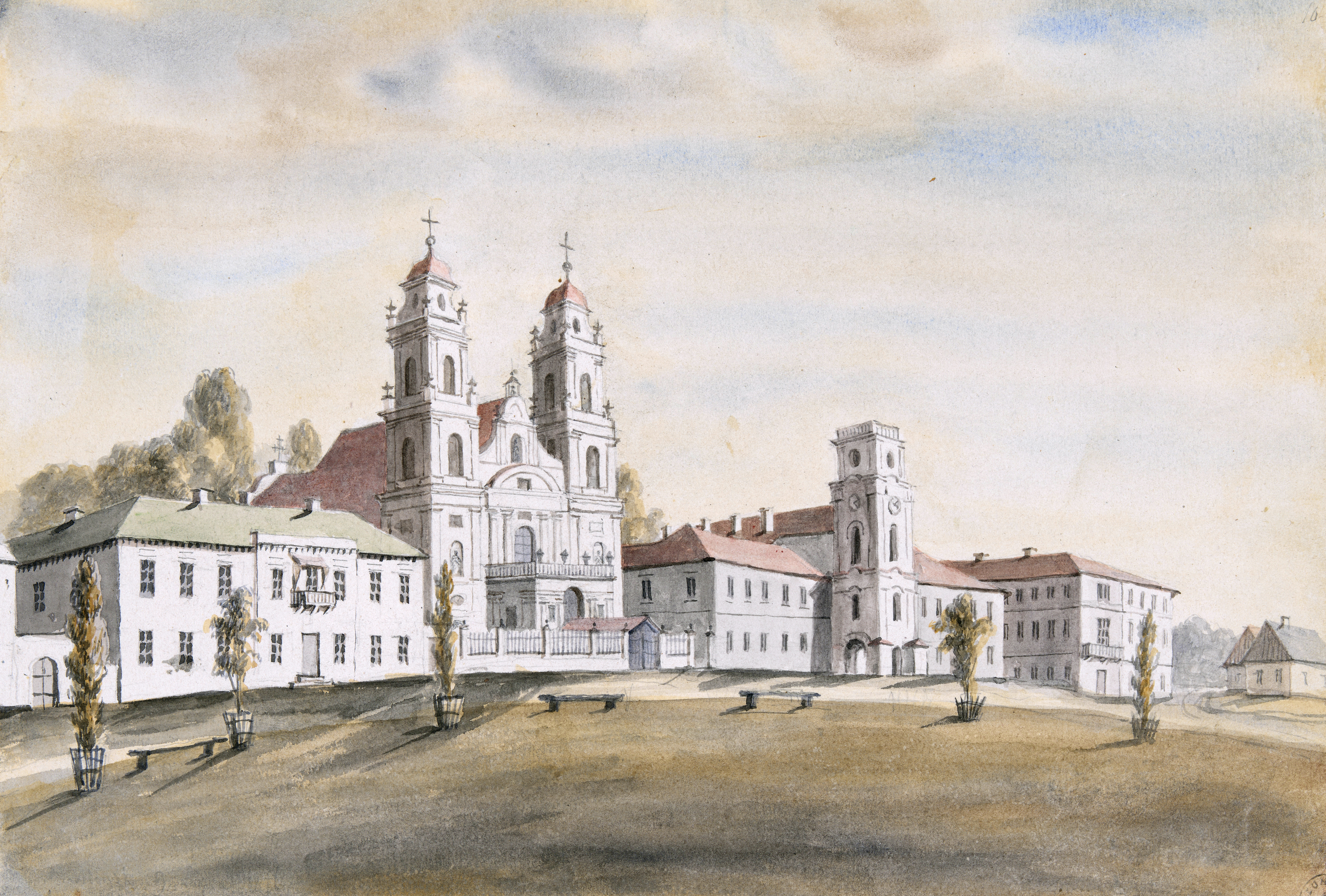
19th-century painting of the Catholic Cathedral and former Jesuit College in Minsk

Minsk was one of the cities, which supported the Polish January Uprising in what is now Belarus in 1863–64. It was under Russian martial law from 1863 to 1870. The suppression of the uprising led to increased repressions against use of the Polish and Belarusian languages, particularly in education and newspapers.

Development of the city was boosted by improvements in transportation. In 1846 Moscow-Warsaw road was laid though Minsk. In 1871 railway link between Moscow and Warsaw ran via Minsk, and in 1873 a new railway from Romny in Ukraine to the Baltic Sea port of Libava (Liepāja). Thus Minsk became an important rail junction and a manufacturing hub. Municipal water supply was introduced in 1872, telephone – in 1890, horse tram – in 1892, and first power generator – in 1894. By 1900 Minsk had 58 factories employing 3,000 workers. The city had theatres, cinemas, newspapers, schools and colleges, as well as numerous monasteries, churches, synagogues and a mosque. According to the 1897 Russian census the city had 91,494 inhabitants, the majority of them Jews. Other large groups were Poles and Russians. Belarusians made only 8% of Minsk's then population (some historians believe, many Belarusians were counted as Russians to boost the number of the latter).

== 20th century ==
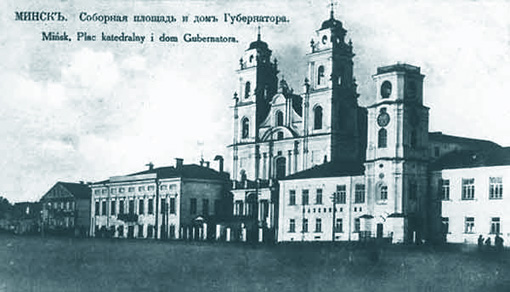
The Jesuit collegium in 1912

In the early years of the 20th century, Minsk was a major centre for the worker's movement within Belarus. It was also one of the major centres of Belarusian national revival, along with Vilnius.

World War I affected the development of Minsk tremendously, by 1915 Minsk was on the front lines. Some factories were closed down and residents began evacuating to the east. Minsk became the headquarters of the Western Front of the Russian army, while also housing military hospitals and military supply bases.

The Russian Revolution had an immediate effect in Minsk. A Worker's Soviet was established in Minsk in October 1917 and it drew its support from disaffected soldiers and workers. After the Treaty of Brest-Litovsk German forces occupied Minsk in February 1918. On 25 March 1918 Minsk was proclaimed capital of the Belarusian People's Republic. The republic was short-lived: in December 1918 Minsk was taken over by the Red Army and in January 1919 Minsk was proclaimed the capital of Byelorussian SSR.

In 1919 (see Operation Minsk) and again in 1920 the city was controlled by the Second Polish Republic in the course of the Polish-Bolshevik war. Under the terms of the Peace of Riga Minsk was handed to Soviet Russia and became the capital of the Byelorussian SSR, one of the constituent republics of the Union of Soviet Socialist Republics.

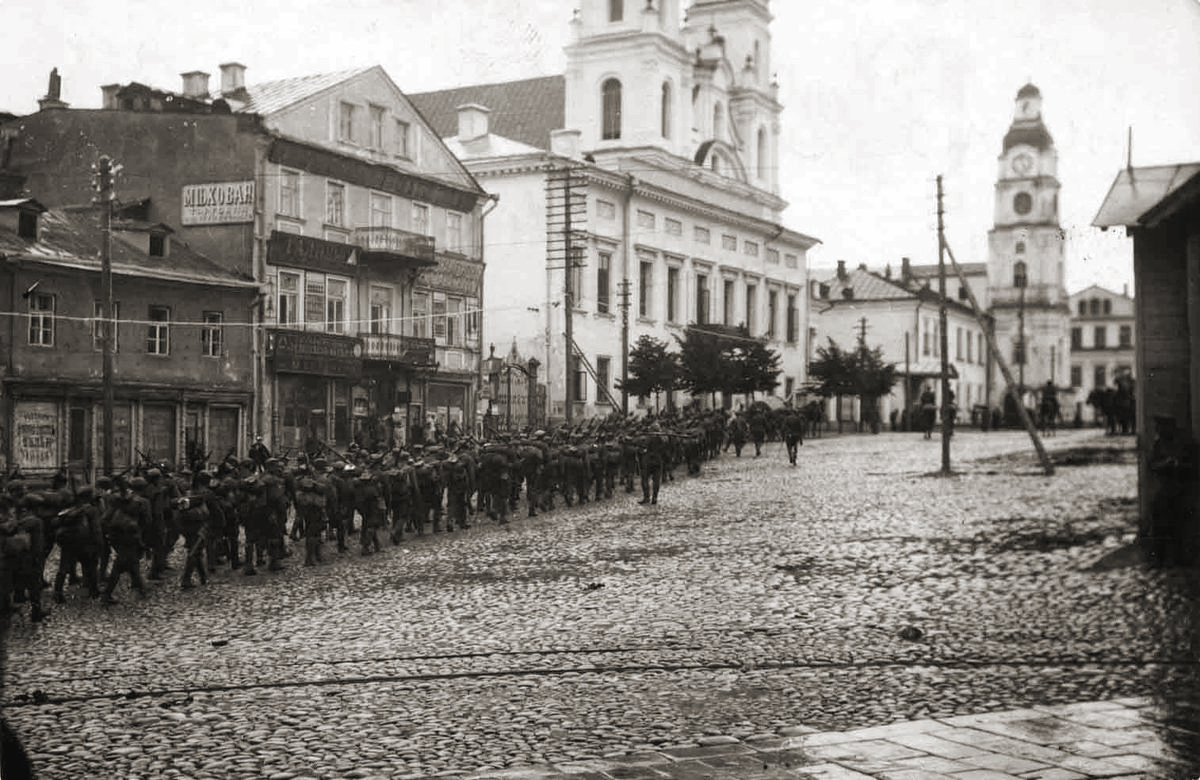
Polish soldiers in Minsk in August 1919

During World War I, the Russian Revolution and the Polish-Soviet War, Minsk suffered significant damage. A programme of reconstruction and development was started in 1922. By 1924 there were 29 factories in operation; schools, museums, theatres, libraries were opening. In 1921 Belarusian State University, now a major university of Belarus, was founded in Minsk. In 1929 an electric tramway was put into operation, and in 1934 the airport (Minsk-1) was opened. Throughout the 1920s and the 1930s Minsk saw rapid development with dozens of new factories built, new schools, colleges, higher education establishments, hospitals, theatres and cinemas opened. Throughout the 1920s and the early 1930s Minsk was a centre for development of both Belarusian language and culture. By 1935 it was virtually bilingual, with Belarusian being the major language of newspapers, theatres and education. In the late 1930s the trend had been reversed with a Russification policy.

Minsk was the center of Communist repression in Belarus in the late 1930s. The NKVD murdered people in Kamarouka, and later in Kurapaty near Minsk. Thousands of Minsk residents from various social and ethnic backgrounds were killed. Soviet authorities particularly oppressed the Belarusian, Polish and Jewish national intelligentsia.

=== World War II ===
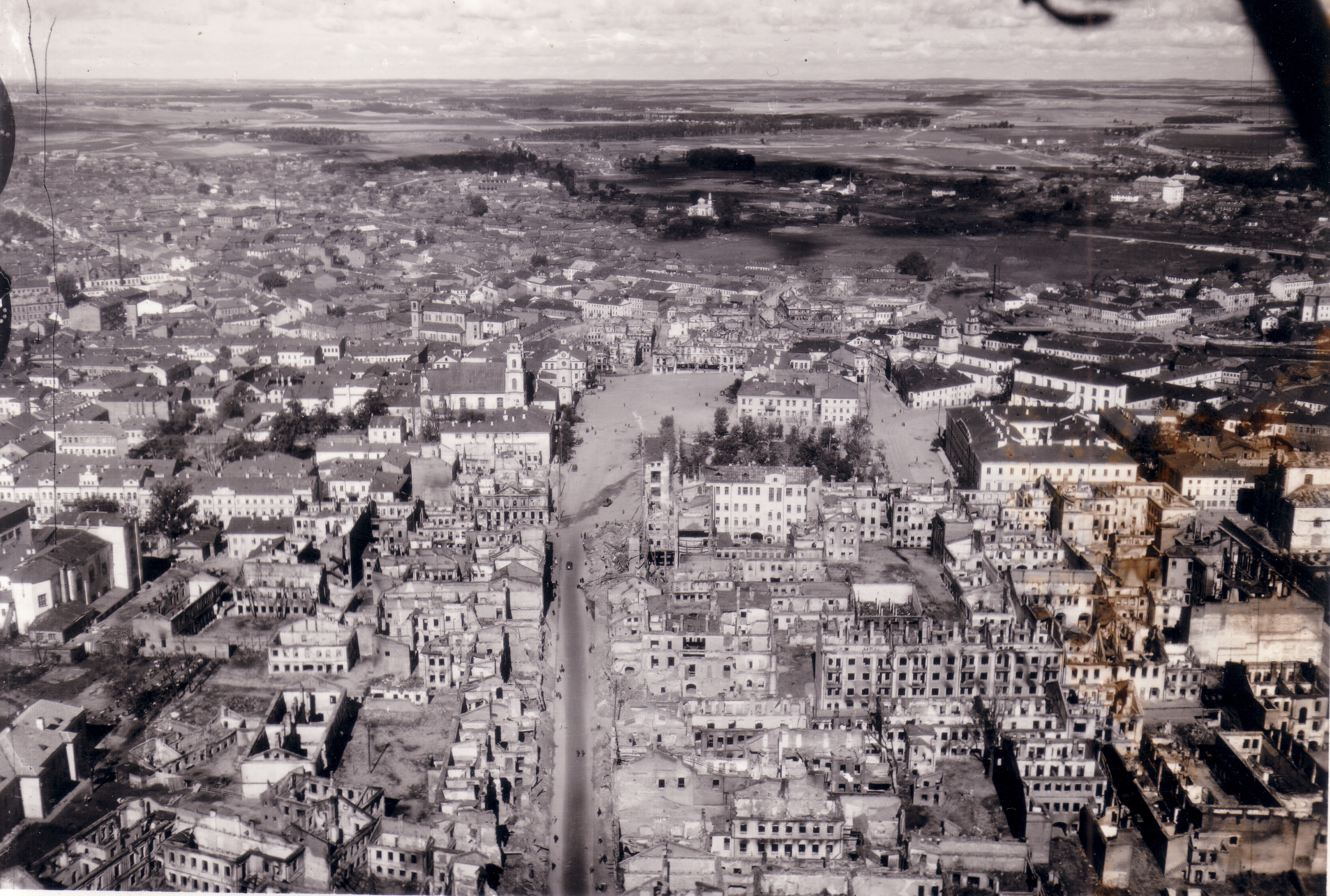
Aerial view in 1941

Before World War II Minsk had a population of 300,000 people. At the start of the war, on 11 September 1939, the Belarusian Front of the Red Army was formed shortly before the Soviet invasion of Poland, and its headquarters was located in Minsk.

After Germany invaded the Soviet Union on 22 June 1941 in Operation Barbarossa Minsk came under immediate attack. The city was bombed on the first day of the war and taken over by the Germans four days later. However, some factories, museums and thousands of civilians had been evacuated to the east.

The Germans made Minsk the administrative centre of the Reichskomissariat Ostland and repressed the local population. Communists and sympathisers were killed or imprisoned; thousands were forced into slave labour, both locally and in Germany. Homes were expropriated to house German occupying forces. Thousands starved as rations were expropriated and paid work was scarce. At the same time, some residents supported the Germans, especially in the earlier years. Some Belarusian nationalists hoped for a formation of a Belarusian national state under the German protectorate, and as a result the city was divided. By 1942 Minsk became a major centre of Soviet partisan resistance against the German occupation during the Great Patriotic War. For this role Minsk was awarded the title Hero City in 1974.

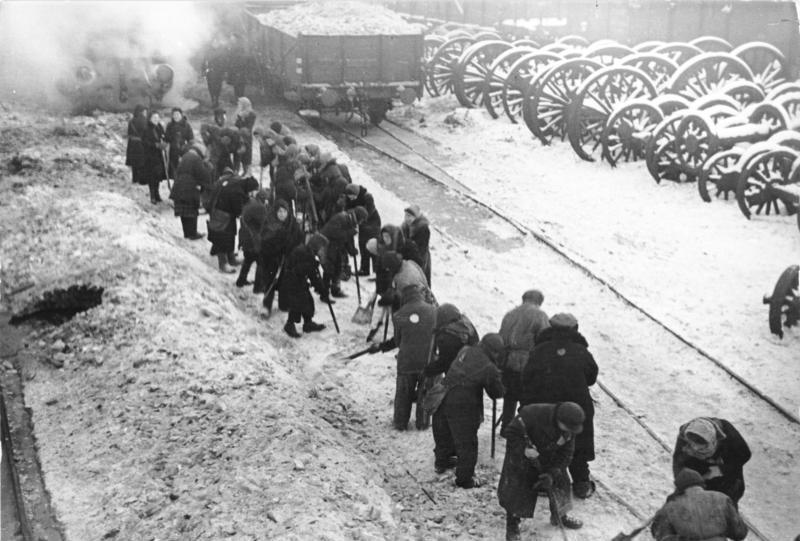
Jewish forced laborers in Minsk in 1942

Minsk was the site of one of the largest Nazi-run ghettos in the World War II, the Minsk Ghetto, which held over 100,000 Jews. A living space of 1.5 square meters was allotted for each person, with none for children. As new Jews were brought to the ghetto from the west, the existing Jewish residents were slaughtered—2,000 Jews were killed on 7 November 1941, 30,000 Jews were murdered over three days in July 1942, and tens of thousands more were killed at other times, even as more Jews were forced into the ghetto. Only a handful survived.

The Germans operated the Dulag 126 and Dulag 127 transit camps for prisoners of war in Minsk in 1941, and then the Stalag 352 prisoner-of-war camp for Soviet and Italian POWs from 1941 to 1944. Some 8,000 POWs of Stalag 352, who were identified as communist political commissars, were executed in October 1941.

Minsk was re-taken by the Soviet troops on 3 July 1944 during the Operation Bagration. The city was the centre of German resistance to the Soviet advance and was a site of heavy fighting between German and Soviet troops; by mid-1944, the city was in ruins. Factories, municipal buildings, power stations, bridges, most roads, and 80% of housing were reduced to rubble. Some churches which survived the fighting were later demolished by the Soviet authorities. In 1944 Minsk's population was down to 50,000, with most residents (especially Jewish residents) having been evacuated or killed.

=== Post-war period ===
After World War II Minsk was re-built, but not re-constructed. The historical centre was substituted in the 1940s and 1950 by Stalinist architecture, which favoured grand buildings, broad avenues and wide squares. In the following years the city grew rapidly as a result of massive industrialisation. This generated the so-called Minsk Phenomenon in the 1960s and 1970s (the phenomenon was caused by combining R&D-intensive manufacturing, research institutions and highly skilled labour, which resulted in high rates of output expansion). Minsk became an important centre for manufacturing (trucks, tractors, refrigerators, television sets, military equipment, optical, etc.) and science. It was home to the Belarusian Academy of Sciences, dozens of R&D institutes in both academic and applied sciences and several universities.

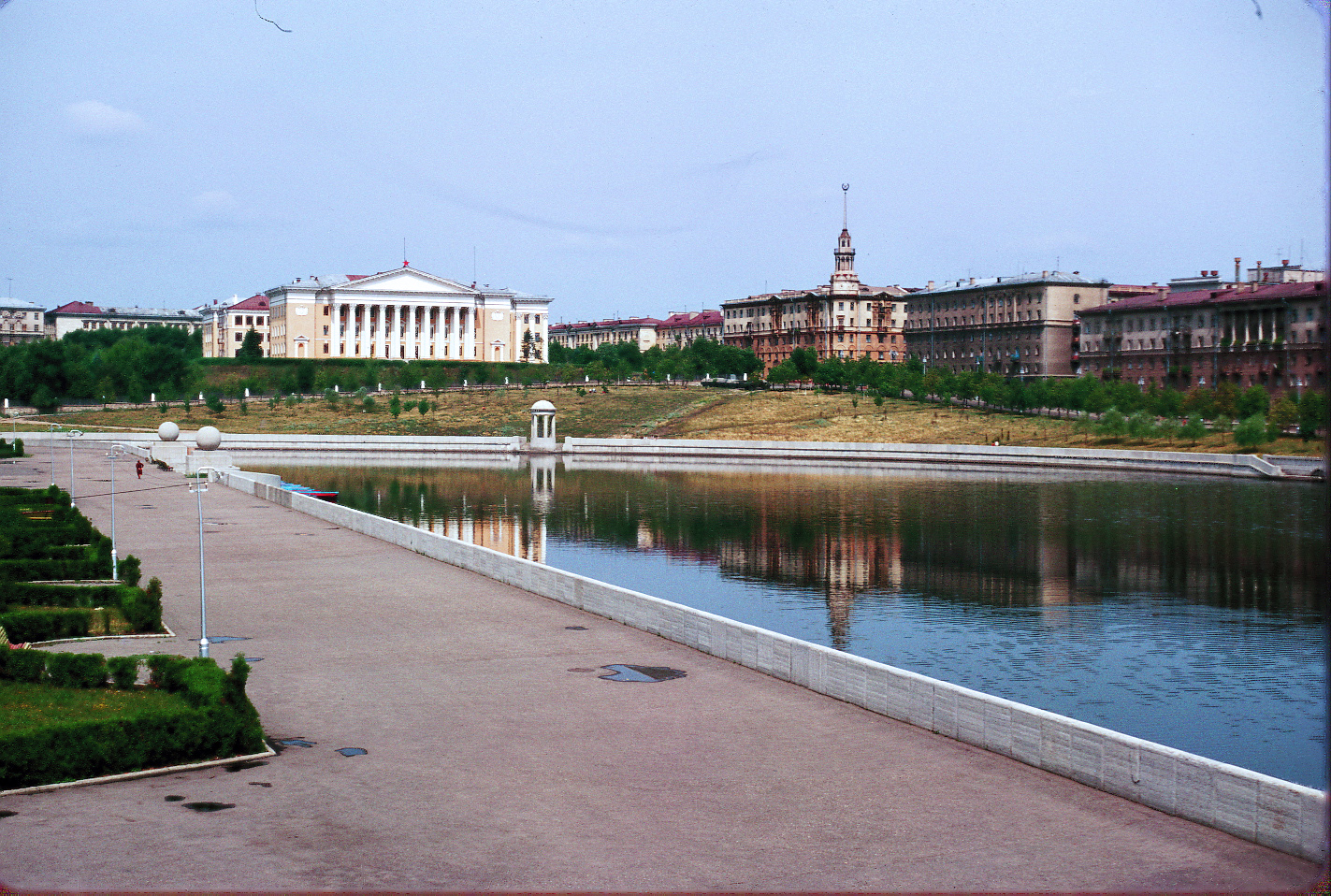
Minsk in 1964

Since the 1960s Minsk's population has grown rapidly, reaching 1 million in 1972 and 1.5 million in 1986. Rapid population growth was primarily driven by mass migration of young unskilled workers from rural areas of Belarus as well as migration of skilled workers from other parts of the Soviet Union. To house the expanding population, Minsk grew dramatically. Its surrounding villages were absorbed and rebuilt as mikroraions, districts of high-density apartment housing. They were normally known as sleeping districts, as they contained few workplaces and entertainment venues. Among the mikroraions, Chyzhouka was built in the 1960s, Serabranka, Zahad, Kurasoushchyna (expanded), Paudnyovy Zahad, Uskhod in the 1970s, Kuntsaushchyna, Malinauka and Uruchcha in the 1980s. To link mikroraions and the city centre, public transportation was developed. It consisted of buses, trolleybuses, trams, and since 1984 of metro system (see Minsk Metro). Minsk Circular Road has been built to provide a bypass for through traffic. International airport (Minsk-2) was built in 1982.

In the late 1980s Minsk once again became a centre for Belarusian national movement. Manifestations and protests during Perestroika called for a return to the use of the Belarusian language and other reforms. In early 1990 Minsk was a location of unexpected industrial action by thousands of workers calling for both economic and political reform. In December 1991 Minsk played an important role in the dissolution of the Soviet Union, as the leaders of Russia, Ukraine and Belarus met there for dissolution talks. Since 1991 Minsk has been the capital of the independent Republic of Belarus.

== Recent developments ==
Throughout the 1990s the city has continued to change. Becoming capital of a newly independent country required obtaining attributes of a capital city. Embassies have been opened, a number of administrative buildings have been turned over into government buildings. During the early and mid-1990s Minsk was hit by the economic crisis – many development projects have been halted, unemployment and underemployment was high. Since the late 1990s there have been improvements in transport infrastructure and arrival of a housing boom, especially after 2002. On the outskirts of Minsk new microraions of residential development have been built. Metro lines have been extended, road system (including the Minsk ring road) have been renovated. Due to small proportion of the private sector in Belarus most of the development has been financed by the government.

Minsk has become one of the centers of the 2020 Belarusian protests. On 9 August 2020 police and soldiers were transported to Minsk to crack down the protests. Security forces were dropping grenades near people, and some people received critical injuries.

== Technology timeline ==
- 1871 – railway
- 1874 – water supply
- 1889 – telegraph
- 1890 – telephone
- 1892 – horse tram
- 1894 – power supply
- 1929 – tram
- 1933 – airport
- 1952 – trolleybus
- 1984 – metro
- 1993 – internet

== Population growth ==
Year	Population
1450	5 000
1654	10 000
1667	2 000
1790	7 000
1811	11 000
1813	3 500
1860	27 000
1897	91 500
1917	134 500
1941	300 000
1944	50 000
1959	509 500
1970	907 100

Year	Population
1972	1 000 000
1979	1 276 000
1986	1 500 000
1989	1 607 000
1999	1 680 000
2006	1 780 000

== Historical names ==
- Mensk, Miensk (Менск), the historical name.
- Polish: Mińsk, Mińsk Litewski, Mińsk Białoruski, used when Belarus was part of the Polish–Lithuanian Commonwealth.

== See also ==
- Timeline of Minsk
- Mińsk Voivodeship
