= 2006 Minsk Summit =

The 2006 Minsk Summit was a Commonwealth of Independent States summit in Minsk, Belarus on November 28, 2006. Officially, the theme of the summit was focused on "questions of the effectiveness and improvement of the commonwealth", thereby addressing complaints by some member states that the CIS had become little more than a forum. The summit coincided with NATO's 2006 Riga Summit in Latvia.
