= Kalvaryja =

Catholic cemetery in Minsk, Belarus

Coordinates: 53°54′30″N 27°30′14″E

Kalvaryja Cemetery
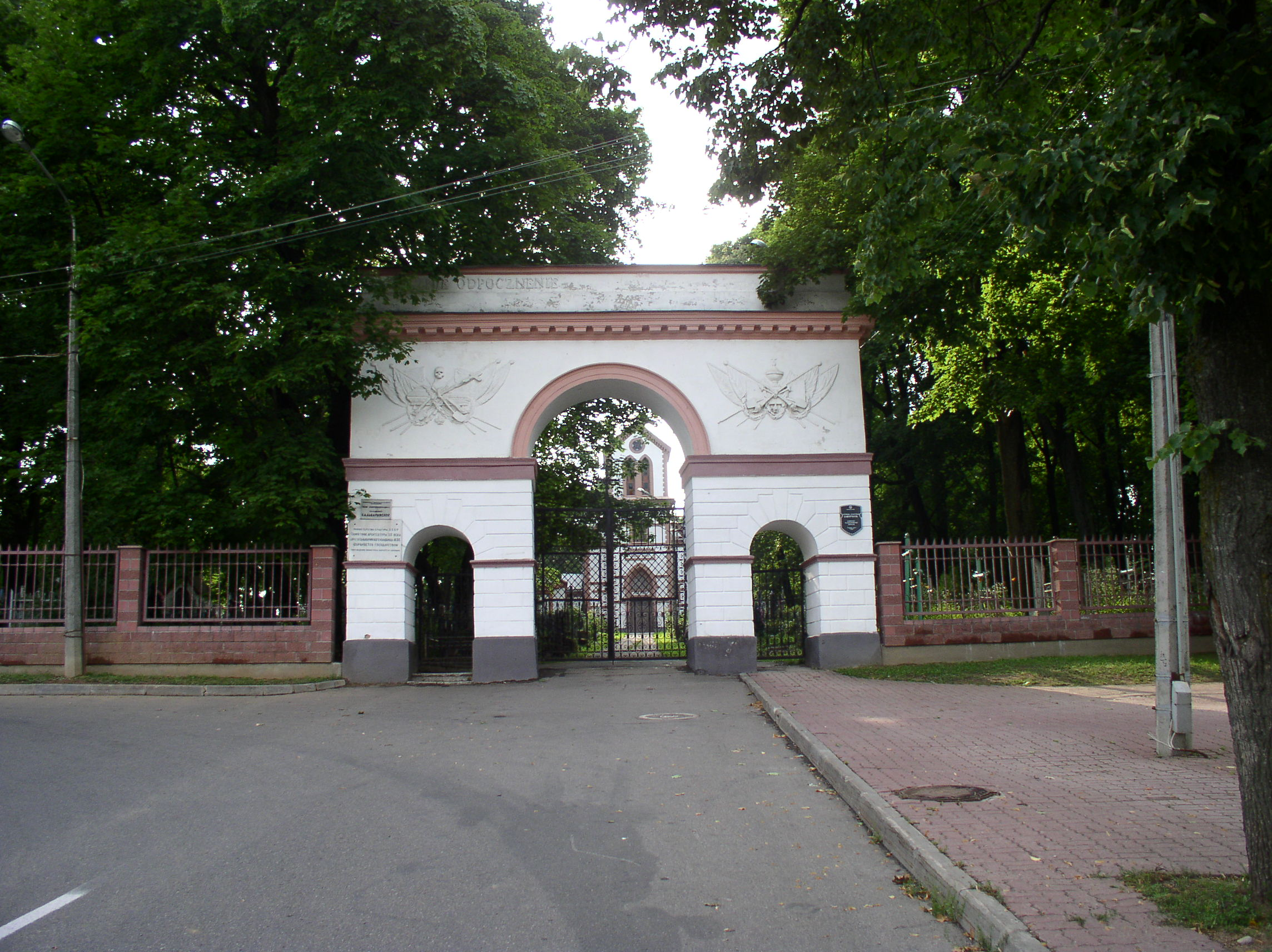
- Kalvaryja entrance
- Interactive map of Kalvaryja Cemetery

Details
- Established: 1808 ?
- Location: Minsk
- Country: Belarus
- Owned by: State
- Size: 13,9223 ha
- No. of graves: 30,000+

Kalvaryja (Belarusian: Кальварыя, [kʌlʲˈvarɨja], Кальварыйскія могілкі) is a Catholic Calvary cemetery in Minsk, Belarus.

The cemetery contains a small Catholic chapel, currently used for general worship. The original wooden Catholic church was first built here back in 1673, but currently the oldest remaining graves are from 1808. The small chapel was built in 1839. Several famous Polish and Belarusian personalities from the 19th century are buried at Kalvaryja.

A historical neighborhood of Minsk, Kalvaryja suburb was formed by the incorporation of the suburb that arose around the Kalvaryja cemetery.

In 2001, the cemetery became the center of a controversy when it was revealed that the state-run company responsible for taking care of the graves was destroying old graves and selling the newly freed slots to the wealthy.

Adam Hlobus wrote a short story set in Kalvaryja.
