= Belarusian Nature and Environment Museum =

Museum in Minsk, Belarus

- Музей прыроды і экалогіі Рэспублікі Беларусь
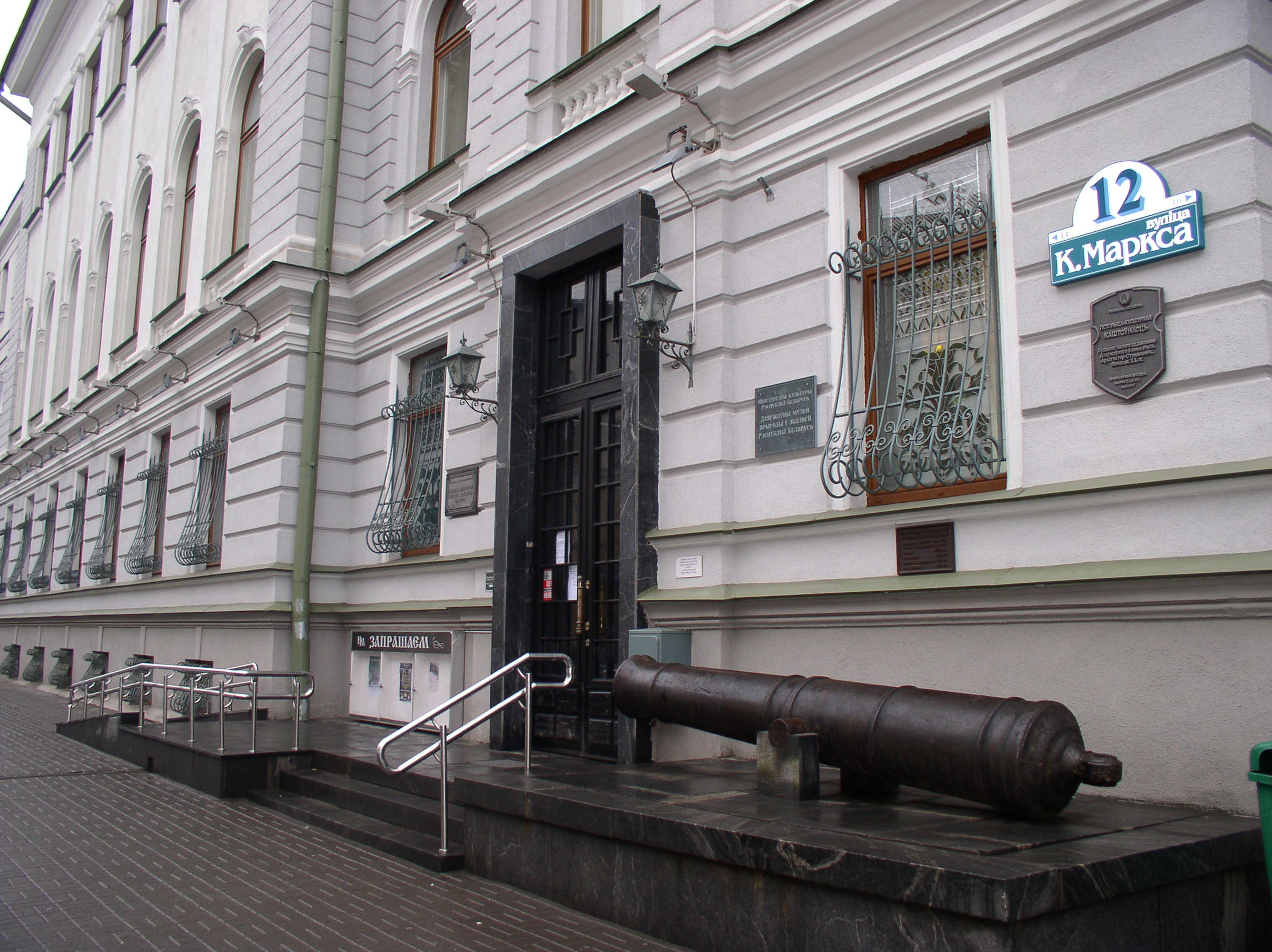
- Facade of the Belarusian National History and Culture Museum, where the museum is located

- Location within Belarus
- Established: July 25, 1983
- Location: Minsk
- Coordinates: 53.896789°N 27.555517°E
- Website: https://web.archive.org/web/20110502002512/http://mus-eco.com/

The Museum of Nature and Environment of the Republic of Belarus (Belarusian: Музей прыроды і экалогіі Рэспублікі Беларусь, romanized: Muzey pryrody i ekalogii Respubliki Byelarus) is a museum in Minsk, Belarus, founded in 1991 at Minsk on the basis of the nature of Belarusian National History and Culture Museum. There are more than 40 thousand exhibits inside an exposition area of 350 m^{2}. In the 6 thematic rooms (mineralogical, fenalagichny, nature, river, lake, forest) exhibits tell about the natural riches of the evolution of flora and fauna from antiquity to the present day.

== Gallery ==
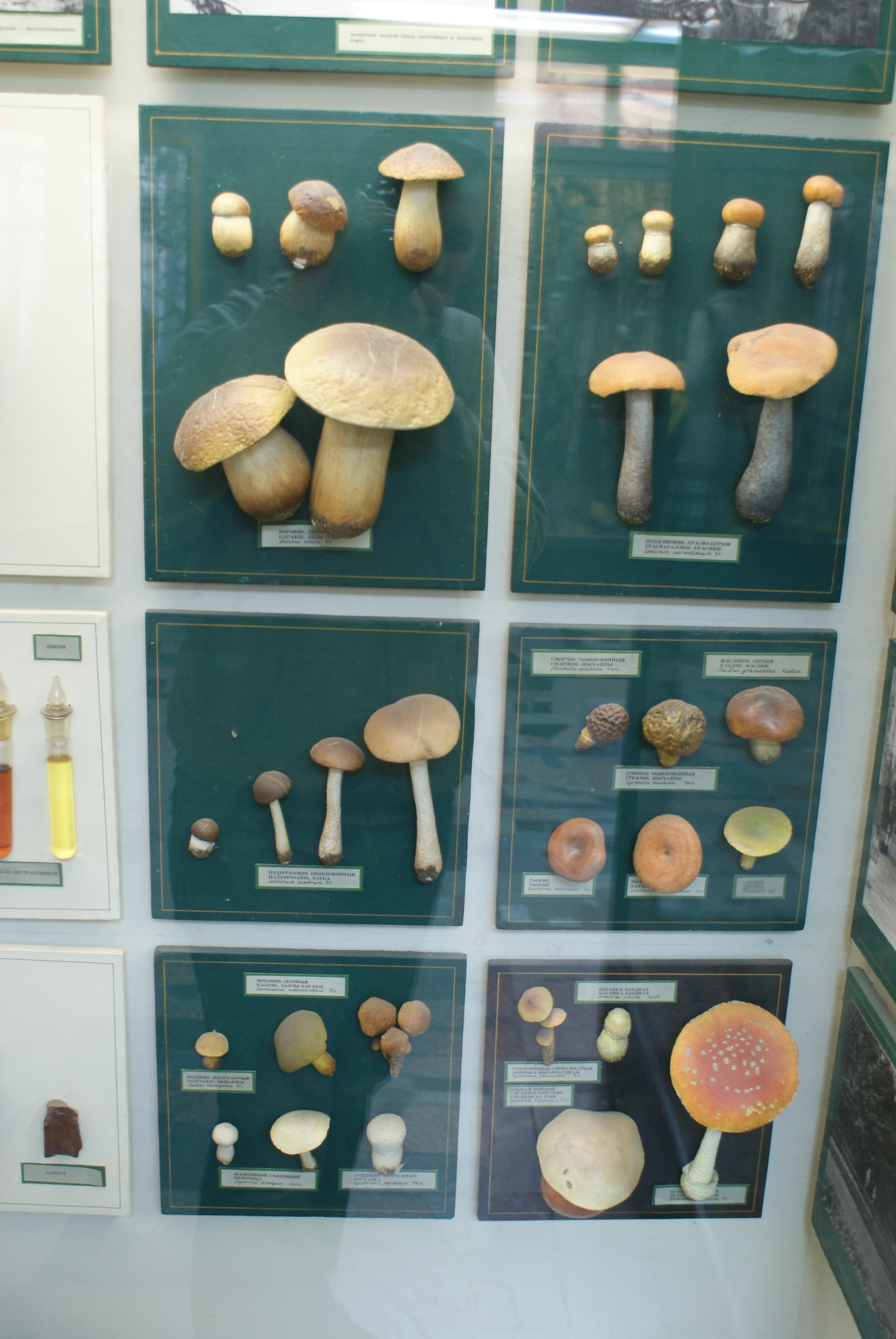

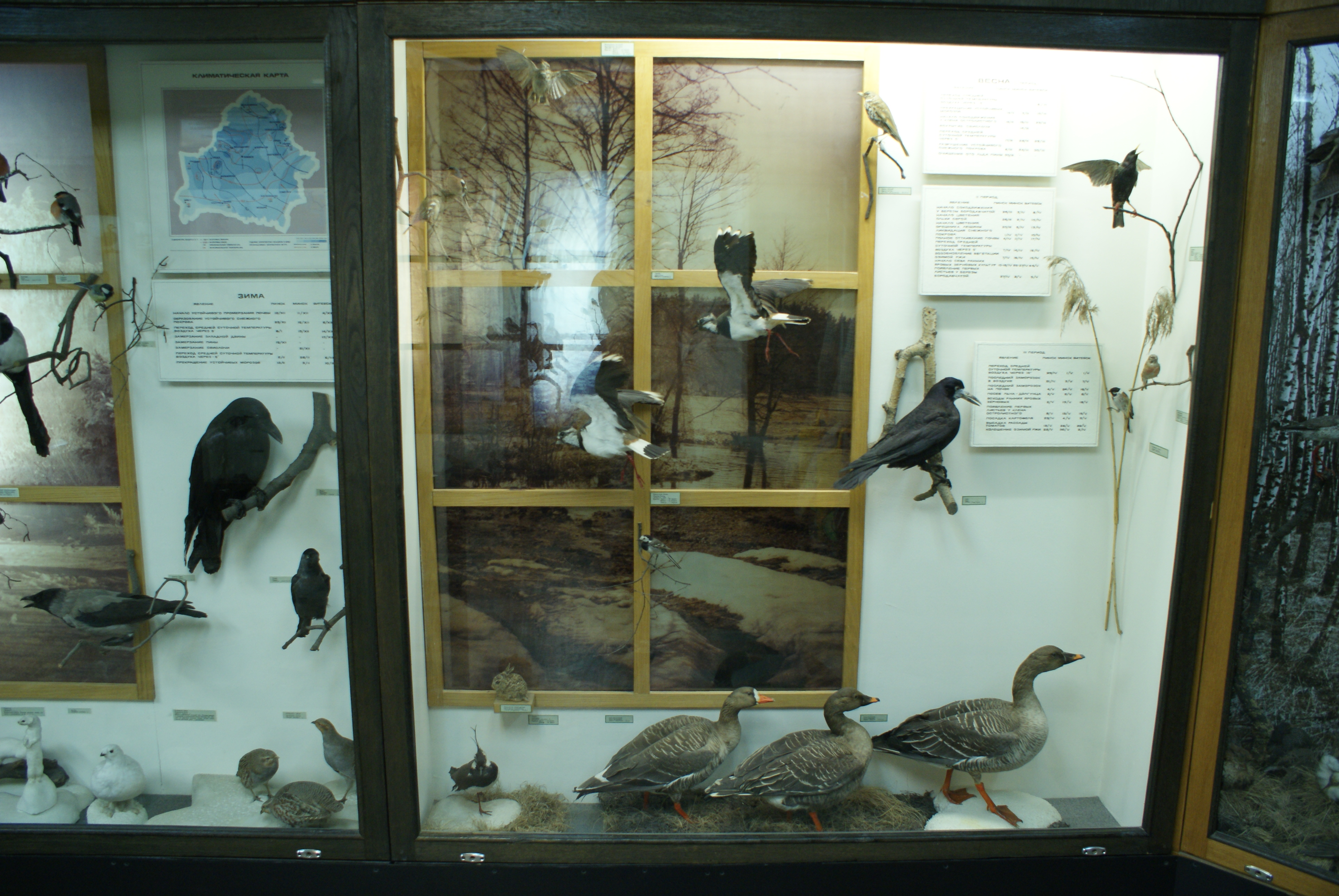

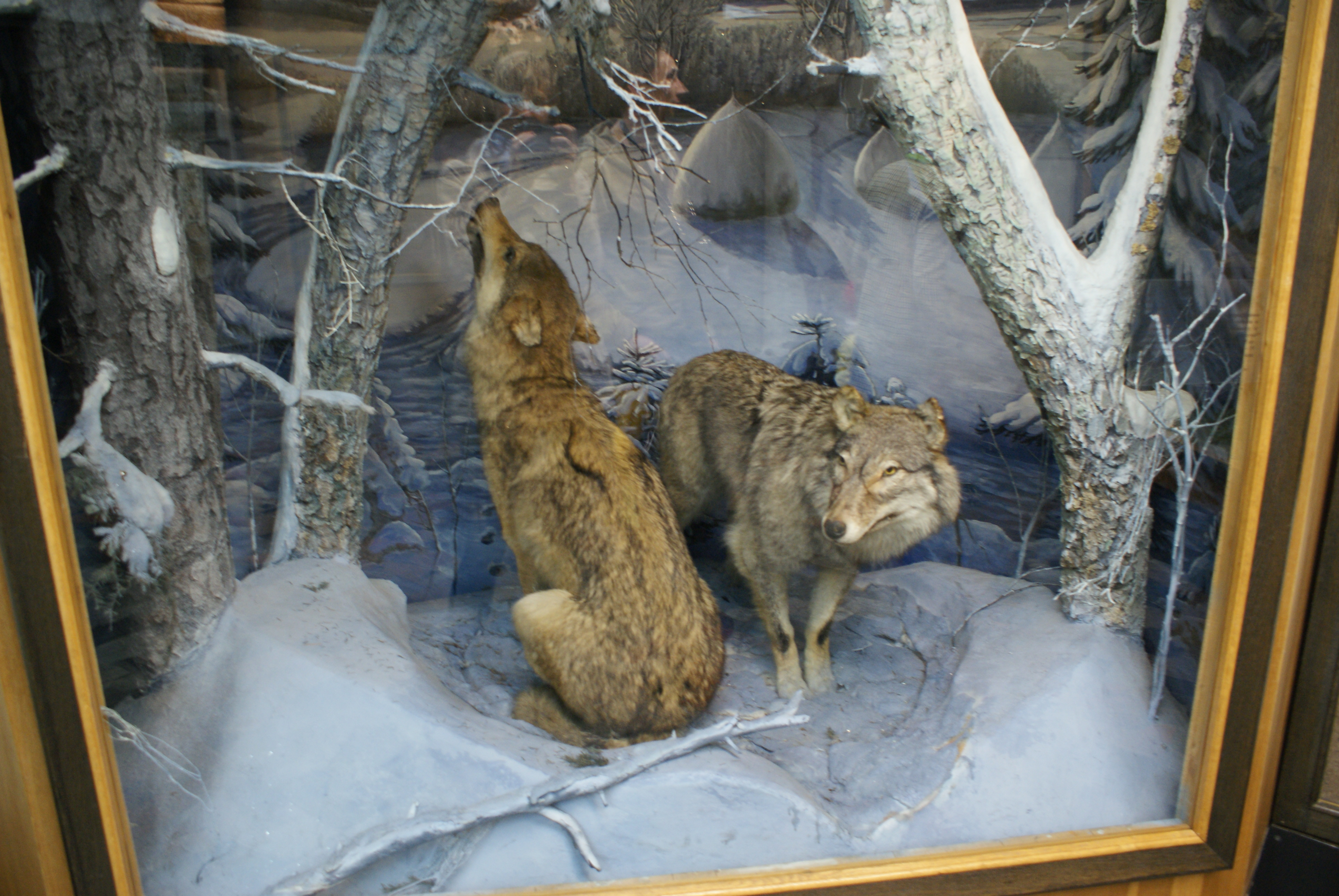

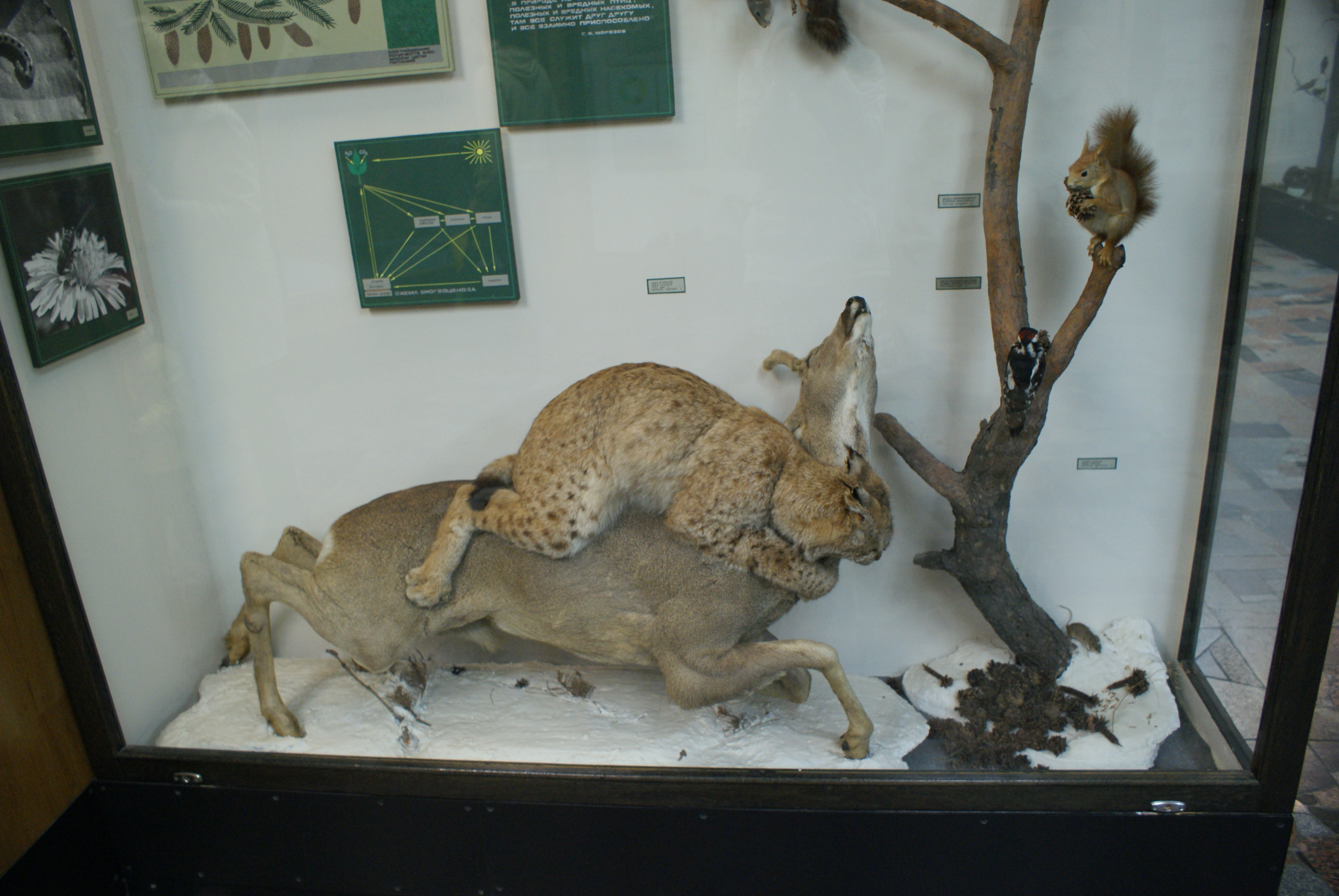

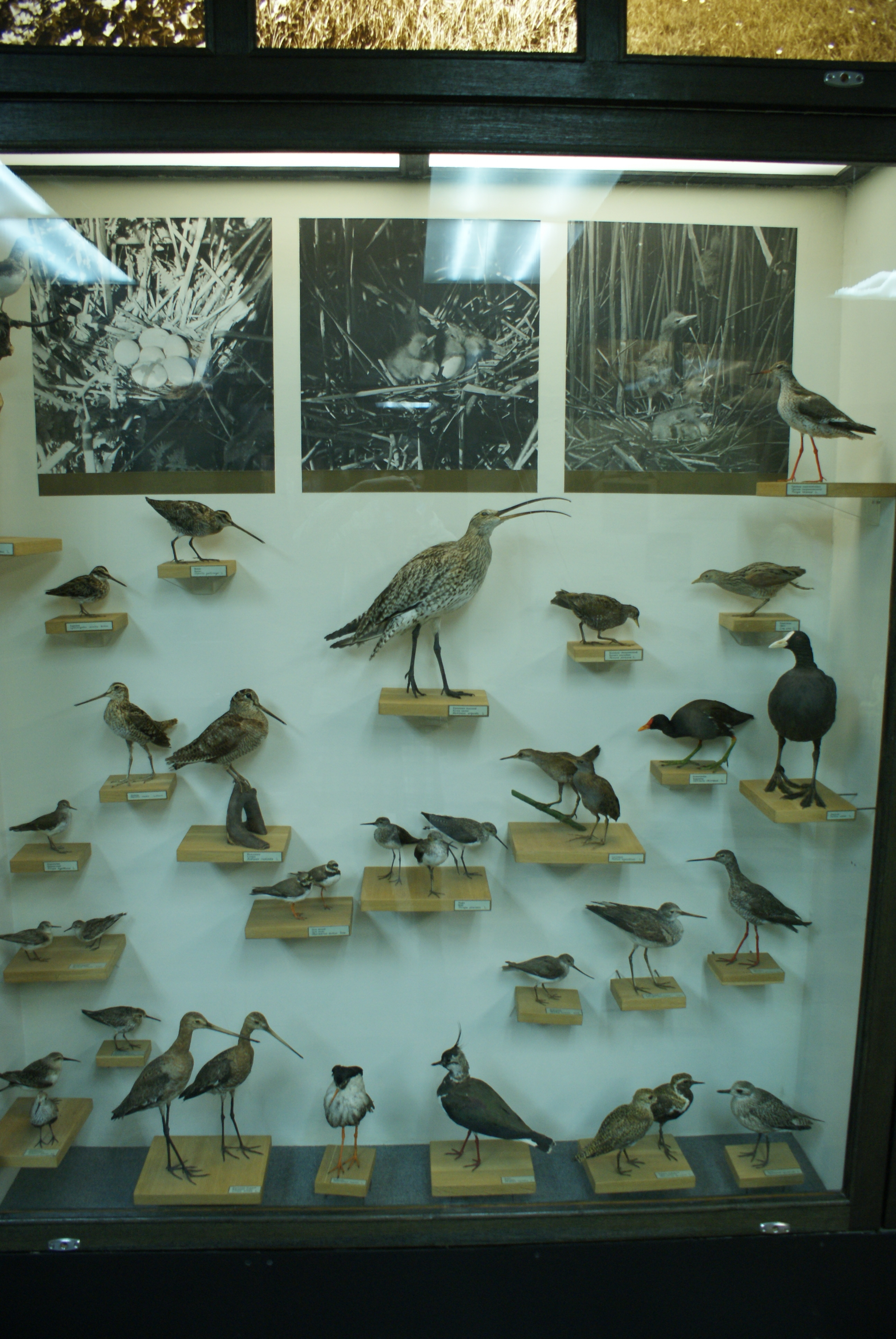

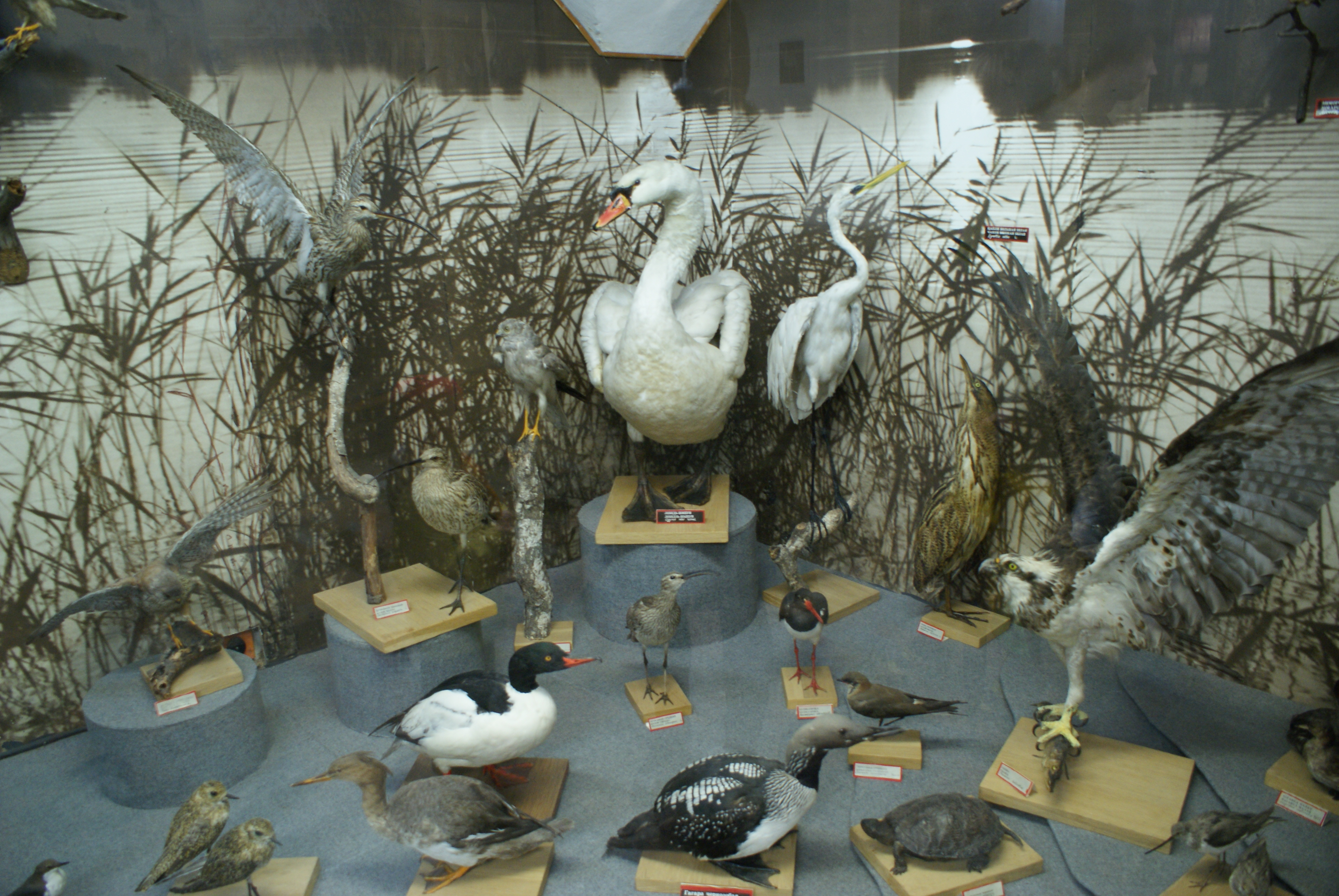

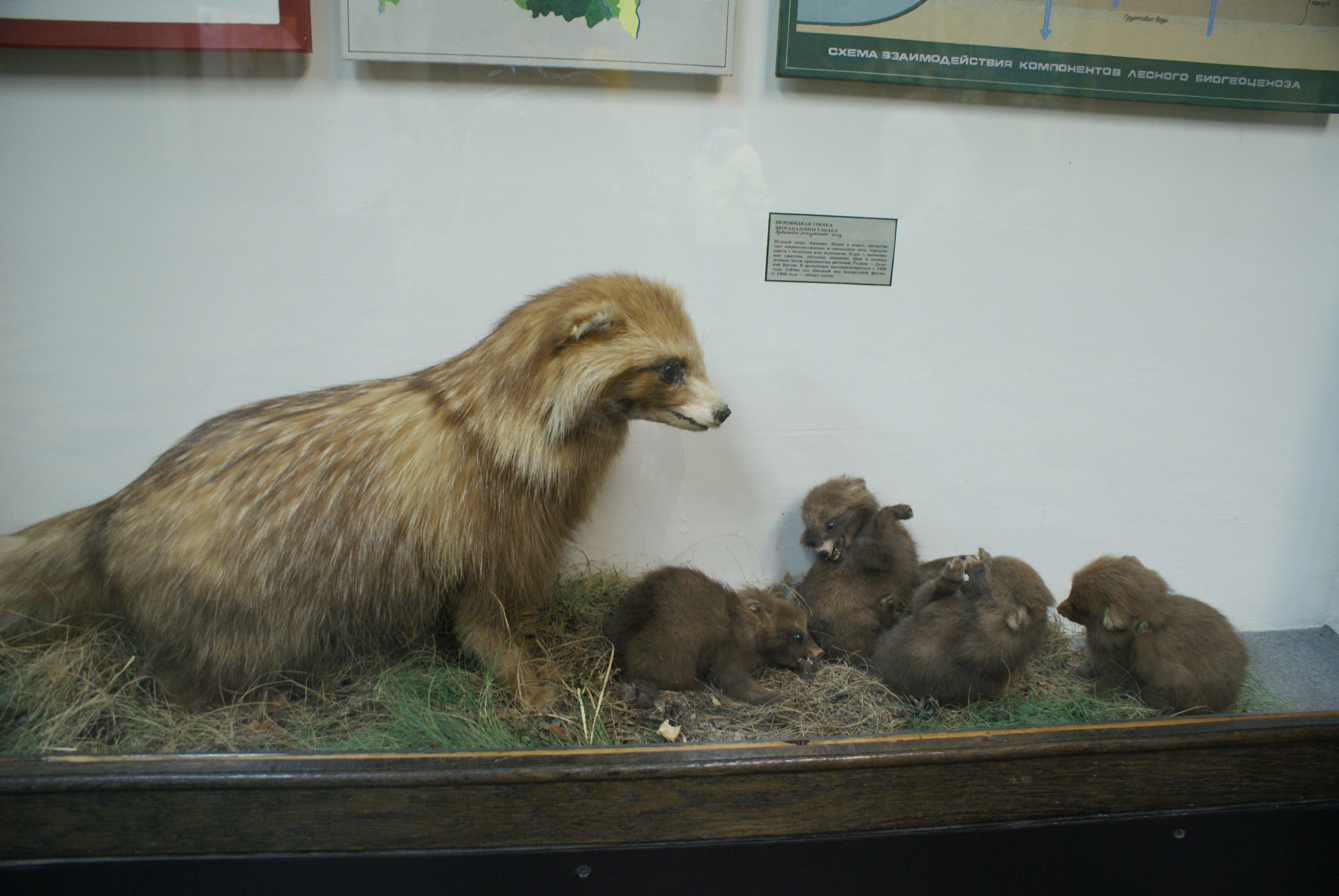

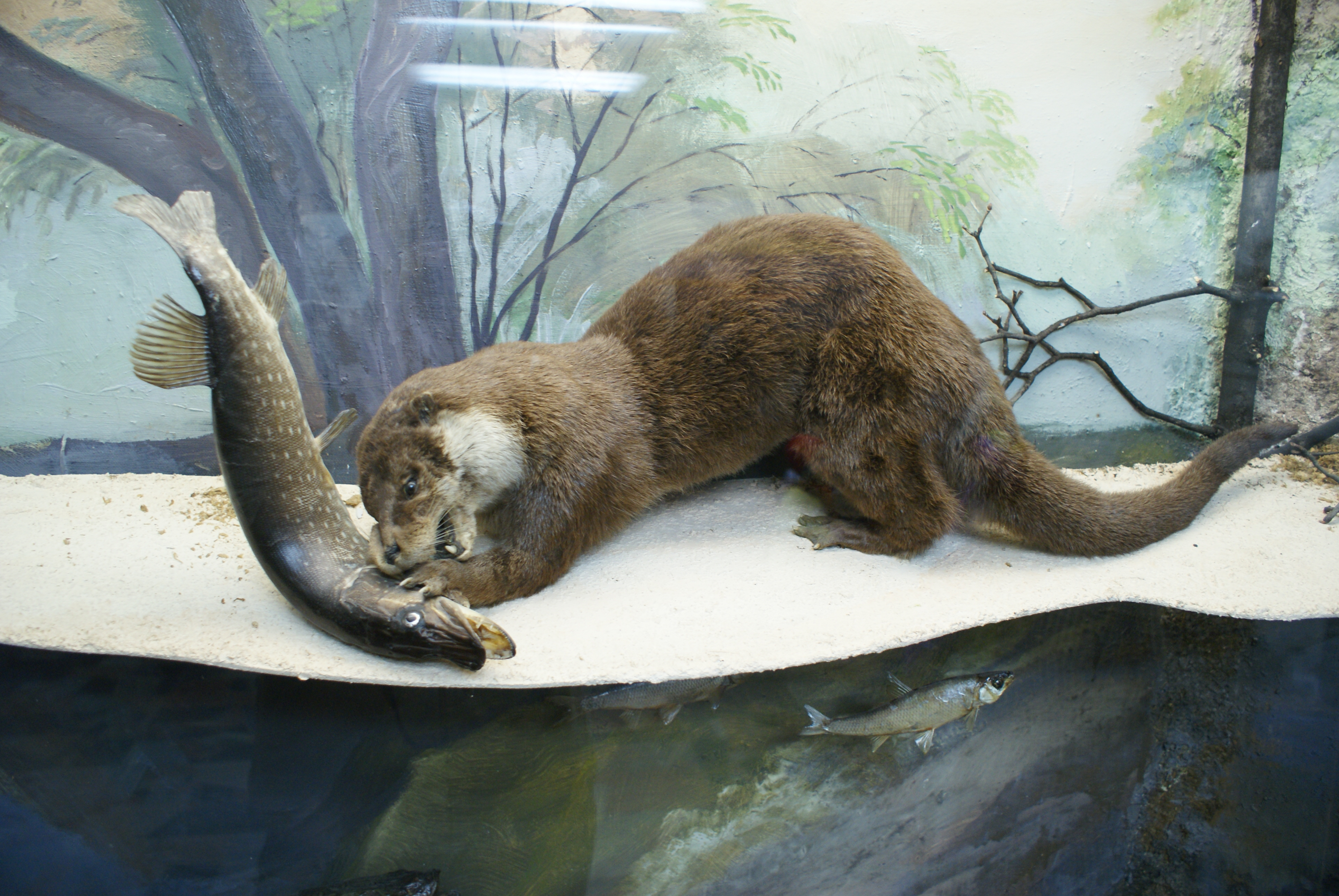

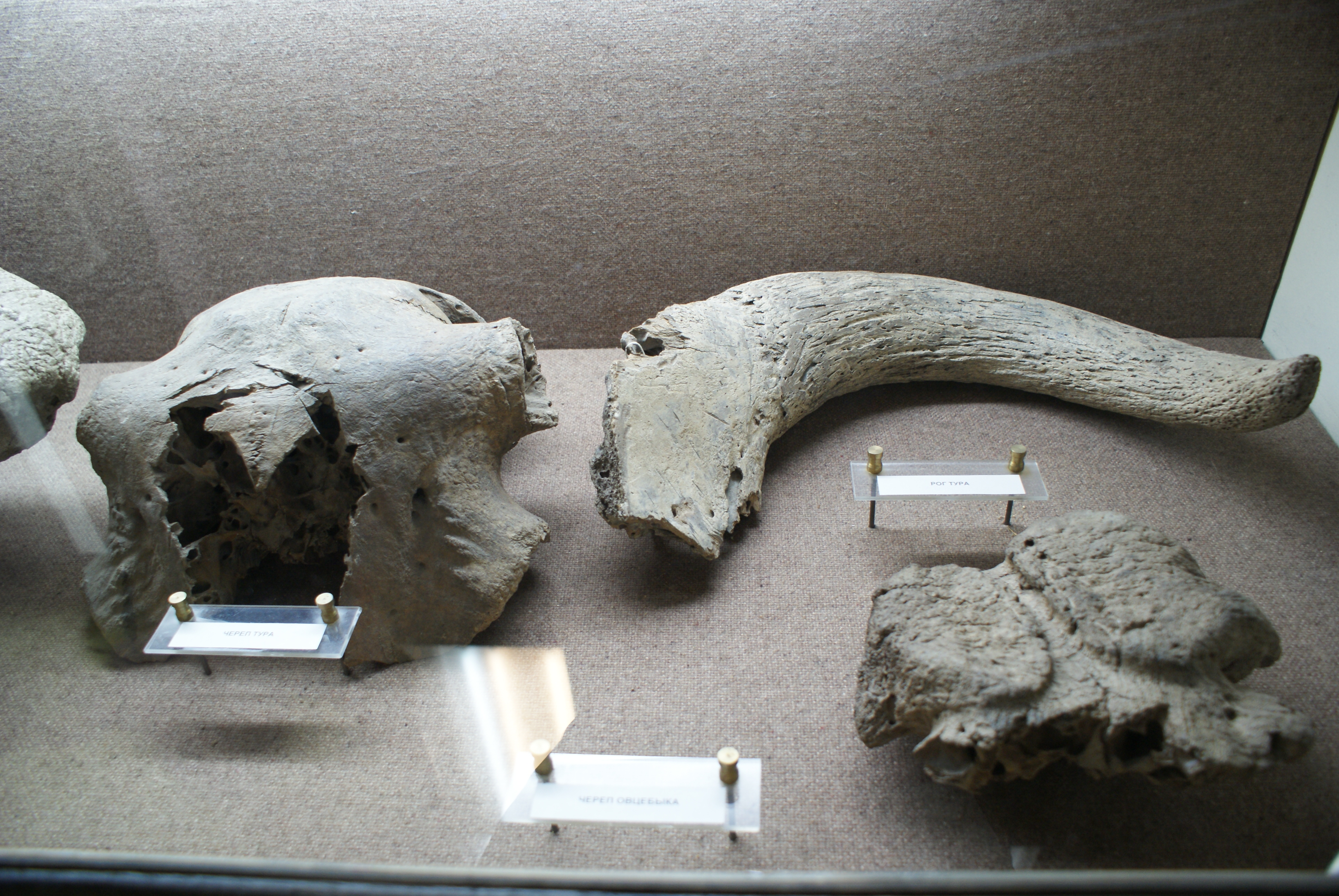
