= National caveats =

Restrictions on use of force placed by NATO on members

A national caveat is a restriction that North Atlantic Treaty Organization (NATO) members place on the use of their forces. NATO General Bantz J. Craddock, NATO's Supreme Allied Commander Europe (SACEUR), was quoted as saying all caveats must be removed in February 2007 in an article written by the Associated Press. The level of constraints (i.e. caveats) is tied directly to the level of national interests a country has in a particular mission and the level of risk it is willing to take.

== National caveats ==
United States officials have urged NATO countries to eliminate caveats, and some steps have been taken to lift them, but the problem appears to remain. At the Riga Summit NATO nations agreed to lift caveats in a time of an emergency, however the definition of an emergency is debatable.

The problem of National Caveats is not new and was identified as a problem during the KFOR mission in Kosovo in 1999. NATO leaders met in Copenhagen, Denmark in 2005 to address the matter of national caveats. They passed RESOLUTION 336 on REDUCING NATIONAL CAVEATS, but the resolution was non-binding, meaning that nations could apply it as they deemed fit.

== Riga Summit ==
In November 2006, NATO held the Riga Summit. At the meetings, President George W. Bush called for countries to lift caveats. However, many analysts say the problem has not been solved. For instance, political scientist Joseph Nye stated in a 2006 article that "many NATO countries with troops in Afghanistan have "national caveats" that restrict how their troops may be used. While the Riga summit relaxed some of these caveats to allow assistance to allies in dire circumstances, Britain, Canada, the Netherlands, and the US are doing most of the fighting in southern Afghanistan, while French, German, and Italian troops are deployed in the quieter north. It is difficult to see how NATO can succeed in stabilizing Afghanistan unless it is willing to commit more troops and give commanders more flexibility."

== Afghanistan ==
Afghanistan was NATO's greatest test as to national caveats. The 28 nation alliance was leading the International Security Assistance Force (ISAF) Mission in Afghanistan, with some forty-eight diverse nations engaged in the nation building operation. Adding to an already complex task, many of the nations in the mission, whether NATO or not, had attached national caveat restrictions on their forces. This created opportunities for the insurgents in parts of the country, whilst also causing no small degree of friction within NATO proper between those nations willing to send their soldiers to the dangerous parts of the country (to fight), and those not willing to do so.

US Army Colonel Douglas Mastriano, in a research project at the US Army War College in Carlisle, Pennsylvania, discussed the challenges that this dilemma poses to the alliance, and although daunting, argues that one should expect this from a system of independent nations that have divergent interests and political will in regard to Afghanistan. He argues that strategic leaders have to operate with what nations are willing to give and thereby leverage NATO's troops where they can do the most good. Despite the difficulties, Mastriano says, "When one looks at the ISAF mission holistically, Afghanistan has been good for the alliance. It has expanded its global role, demonstrated that it can conduct a sustained out of area mission, NATO can operate with coalition partners from around the world, it has endurance (now ten years in Afghanistan, and counting) and that it is not easily intimidated. Despite the Taliban's efforts otherwise, NATO has endured relatively high casualties (higher than many nations anticipated), and despite this, none of these nations have retreated in the face of it."

As to the Afghan mission, Mastriano says, "Nine years after the 9/11 attacks, things look grim in Afghanistan, but it is not too late. NATO, and her strongest partner, the US, possess both the initiative and ability to turn things around... They simply must do the hard work to create unity of effort and unity of command through capable leadership because losing is not an option."

== Iraq ==
Caveats are also applied in Iraq. According to an article written by Major General Rick Lynch and Lieutenant Colonel Phillip D. Janzen, US Army, "National caveats on personnel participating in NATO-led operations are not a new challenge. Lessons learned from operations in the Balkans often emphasize the impact of caveats on that mission. Nations contributing personnel to the NATO Training Mission - Iraq (NTM-I) also apply operational caveats to their force offerings, to include restrictions on the place of duty and length of deployment. Operational impacts from caveats are countless but include restricting force protection troops from securing vehicle convoys. Another case involves limiting personnel to duty in Baghdad's International Zone."
