= Caveat (property law) =

Legal term meeting "beware"

Caveat is Latin for "beware". In Australian property law and other jurisdictions using the Torrens title system, a caveat is a warning that someone other than the owner claims some right over or nonregistered interest in the property. Caveats can include ongoing court cases, bad debts or second mortgages.

== The lodging of caveats ==
According to Samantha Hepburn, "caveat's function as notification of an interest: once lodged they do not guarantee any title".

A person acquires a "caveatable interest" (that means the buyer is entitled to place a caveat to defend that interest) when he/she purchase real estate. The Registrar of Titles must notify the caveator before deal with the property.

The caveator should find the right time to place the caveat. First person to place the caveat is will be the legal property owner, for example.

There are many parties which can lodge the caveat. Banks often lodge caveats to protect their interest when extending a mortgage loan.

== Withdrawal of caveats ==
The caveator can withdraw their caveat at any time. The Land Titles Office cannot register any transactions regarding the estate while a caveat applies.

A lapsing notice will require the caveator to commence Supreme Court proceedings and obtain an extension of the caveat within days of the date on which the notice was served. If the caveator does not take action, the caveat will lapse.

== Sources ==
Hepburn, Samantha (2013). Australian Principles of Property Law. Routledge. pp. 259–260. ISBN 9781135315788.
