= Old Belarusian History Museum =

Museum in Minsk, Belarus

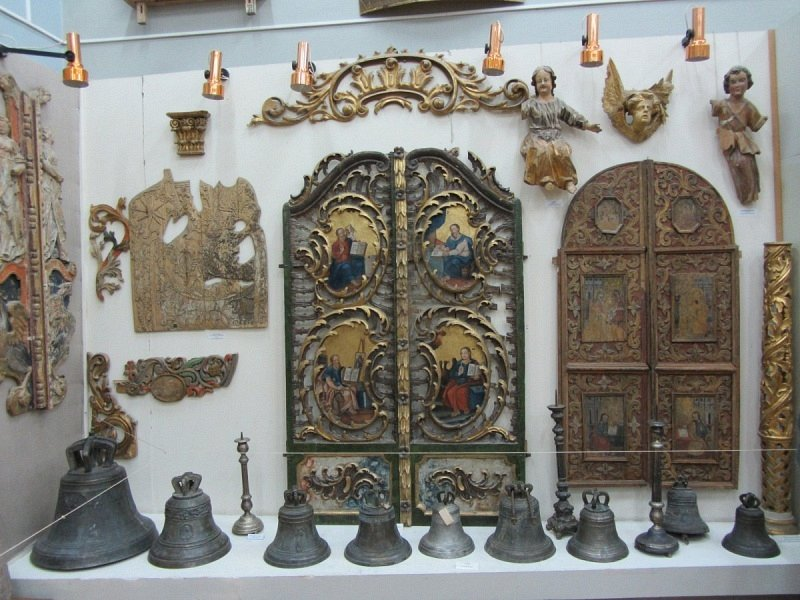
- Location: Belarus
- Coordinates: 53°55′00″N 27°36′12″E
- Website: nasb.gov.by/bel/organizations/museums/belmuseum.php
- Location of Old Belarusian History Museum

Old Belarusian History Museum (Belarusian: Музей старажытнабеларускай культуры, romanized: Muziej staražytnabielaruskaj kuĺtury) is a museum in Minsk, Belarus.

The museum was founded in 1977 as a center for the study and promotion of the Belarusian artistic heritage.

The basis of the museum collection includes unique exhibits collected for many years by the staff of the Institute of Art History, Ethnography and Folklore named after K. Krapiva (IIEF) in the course of art criticism and ethnographic expeditions throughout Belarus.

== Exhibition ==
The total area is 1,200 metres (3,900 ft), while the exhibition area is 600 m2. More than 17,000 items were exposed in 2000, including 600 works of icons and painting, 4,500 arts and crafts, 170 sculptures, and a thousand samples of folk weaving.

The exposition has sections of archeology (finds from excavations of cities and other archeological monuments of Belarus), art (icons of the XVI-XVIII centuries, sculpture of the XVI-XIX centuries, Slutsk belts).et al. fabrics of the 18th century, old prints and book engravings of the 16th-18th centuries, carvings, metal works (art), ethnography, weaving, folk costumes from the end of the 19th to beginning of the 20th century, ceramics, folk musical instruments, tools, household utensils, products of straw, etc.). A separate section is dedicated to the monuments of ethnography and folk art of the Chernobyl zone.
