= Belarusian National History Museum =

History museum in Minsk, Belarus

Coordinates: 53°53′48″N 27°33′20″E

- Нацыянальны гістарычны музей Рэспублікі Беларусь
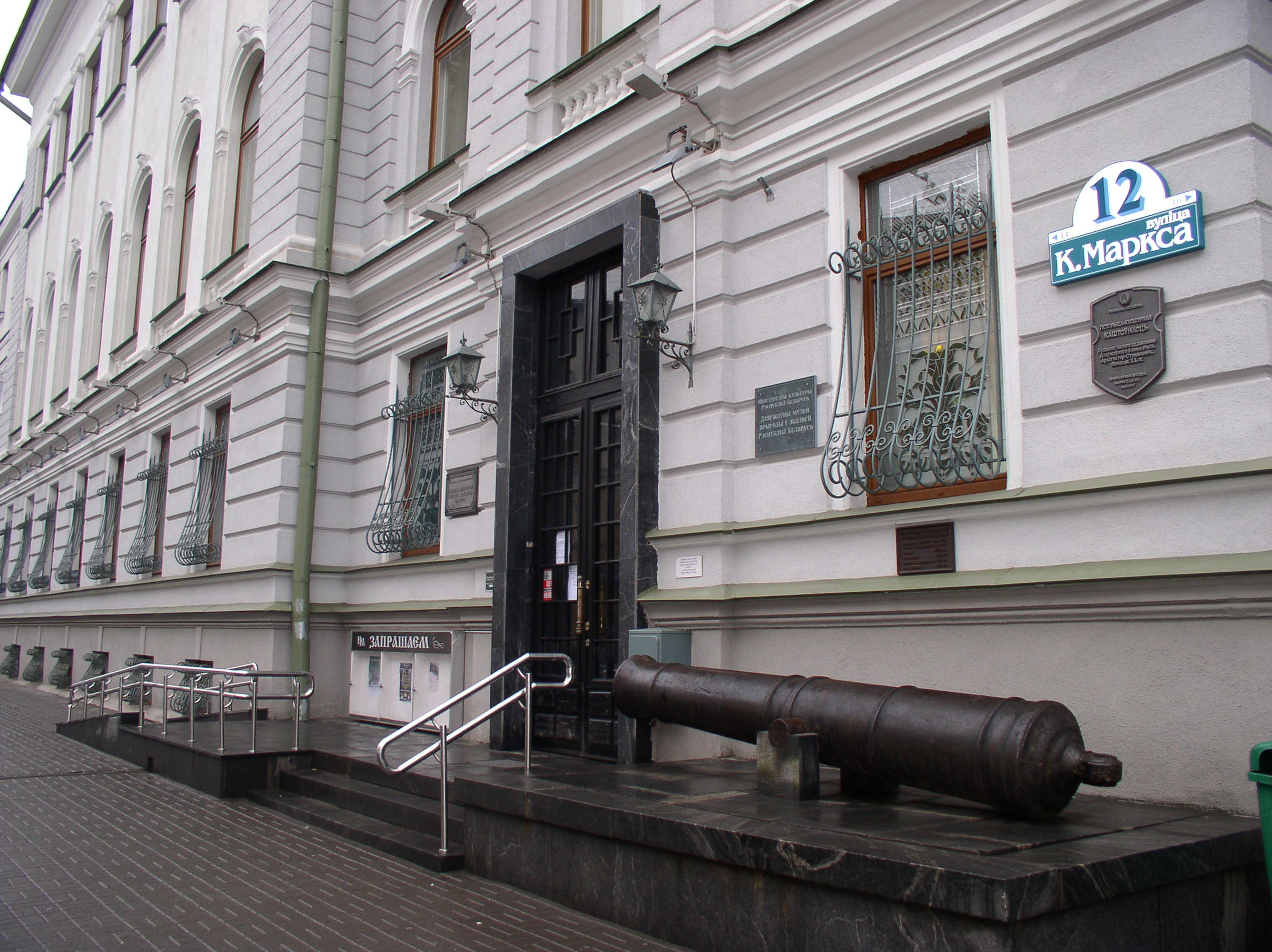
- Entrance to the Belarusian National History and Culture Museum
- Location: Minsk, Belarus
- Type: History museum
- Website: histmuseum.by/en/

Belarusian National History and Culture Museum (Belarusian: Нацыянальны гістарычны музей Рэспублікі Беларусь, romanized: Natsyyanalny gistarychny muzey Respubliki Byelarus) is a history museum in Minsk, Belarus. The museum holds the biggest collection of monuments of the material and spiritual culture of the Belarusian people from ancient times to the modern day. The museum's collection holds approximately 500,000 items. The museum has five branches: Museum of Belarusian Cinema History, House Museum of First Congress of the Russian Social Democratic Labour Party, Museum of Contemporary Belarusian Statehood, Museum of Nature and Environment of the Republic of Belaurus, and the Museum of Belarusian Cinema History.

== History ==
The Belarusian National History and Culture Museum has its roots in Belarus' first state museum, the Minsk Regional Museum established in 1919. After going through several names and administrations, the museum was renamed to the National Historical Museum of the Republic of Belarus in 2009.
