= Russification of Belarus =

Overarching impact fostering a transition from Belarusian to Russian

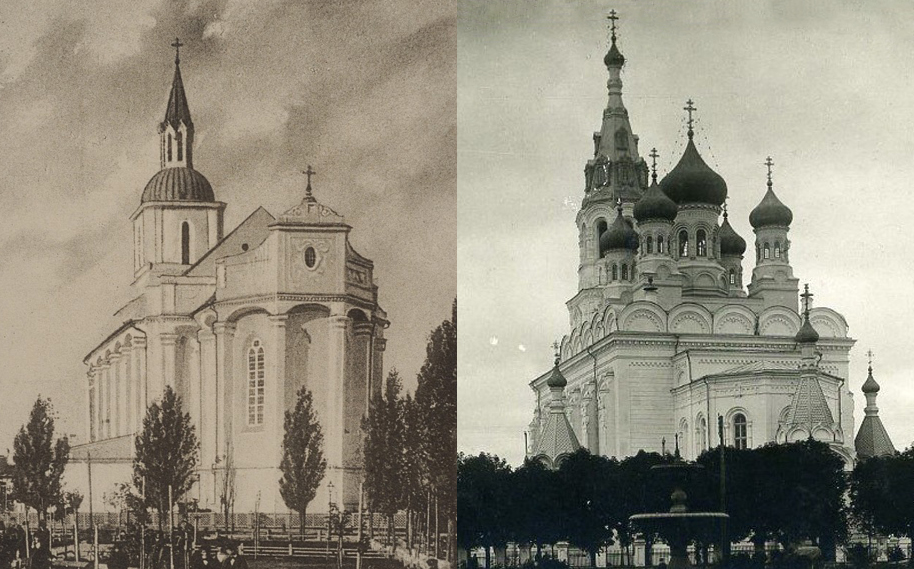
Example of Russification in the 19th century; the reconstructed Church of St. Mary's (no longer exists) in Grodno (Hrodna)

The Russification of Belarus (Note: Belarusian: Русіфікацыя Беларусі, romanized: Rusifikacyja Biełarusi; Russian: Русификация Беларуси, romanized: Rusifikatsiya Belarusi) denotes a historical process where the integration of Russian language and culture increasingly influenced Belarusian society, especially during the 20th century.

This period witnessed a notable rise in the use of the Russian language in education, administration, and public life, often paralleling and sometimes overshadowing the Belarusian cultural and linguistic elements.

== Russian Empire ==
=== Historical background ===
Following the partitions of Polish–Lithuanian Commonwealth in the late 18th century (1772, 1793, 1795), the Russian Empire gained control over a large part of Belarusian territory. This period saw the beginnings of a deeper Russification process, wherein the Russian authorities faced the challenge of integrating a region where the majority of the nobility and a significant proportion of the urban population, along with the Uniate clergy, predominantly spoke Polish, while approximately 90% of the rural populace retained Belarusian as their primary language.

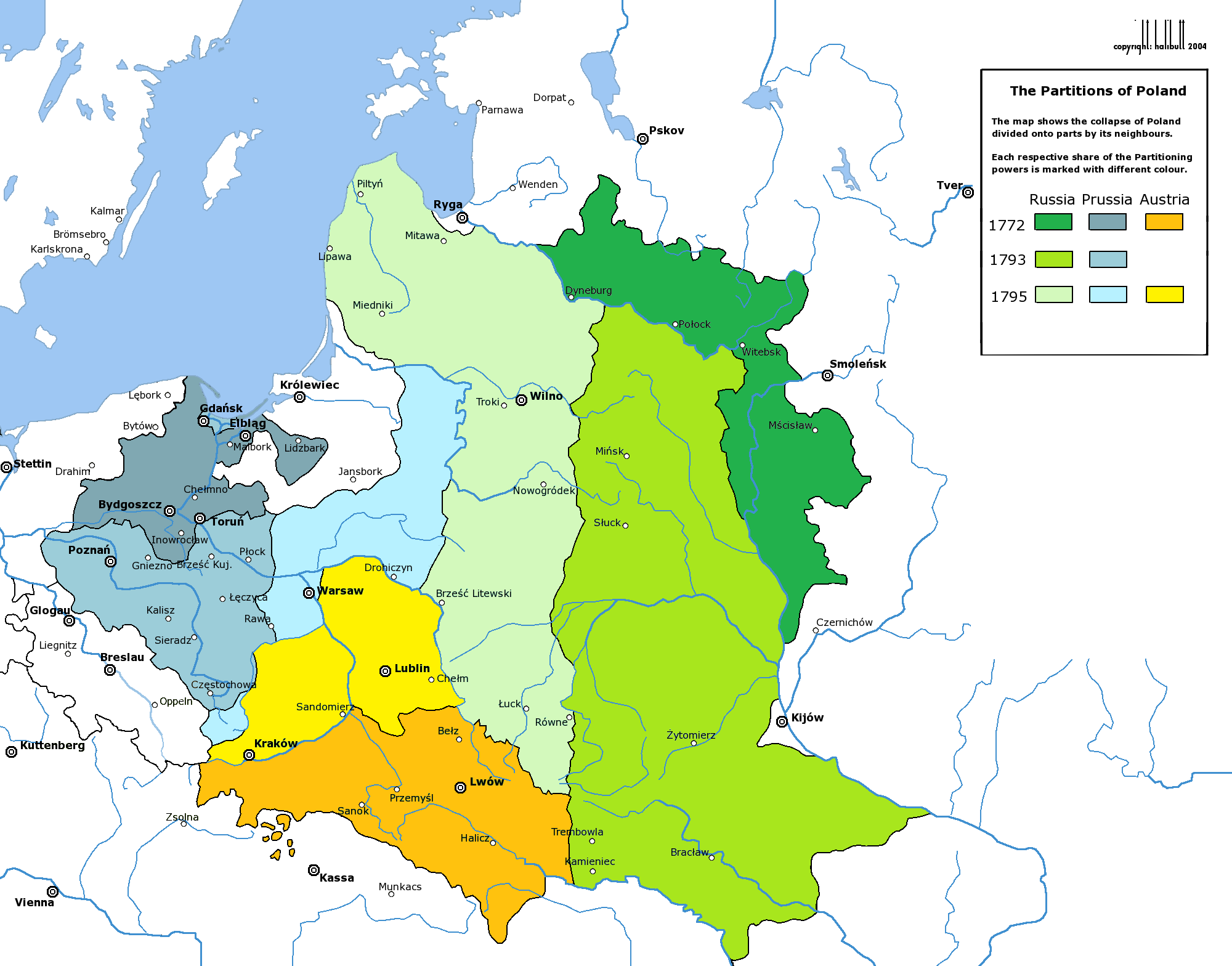
Partitions of the Polish-Lithuanian Commonwealth in 1772, 1793 and 1795

In the context of the 17th through the early 20th centuries, Russification was more broadly conceptualized as the cultural assimilation aimed at consolidating the three principal East Slavic groups under the imperial Russian identity: the Great Russians (Russians), the Little Russians (Ukrainians), and the White Russians (Belarusians). The term "Russian language" in these policies typically referred to the Great Russian dialect, which was promoted as the primary literary and administrative standard. This period also saw the official recognition and occasional publication of Belarusian literature.

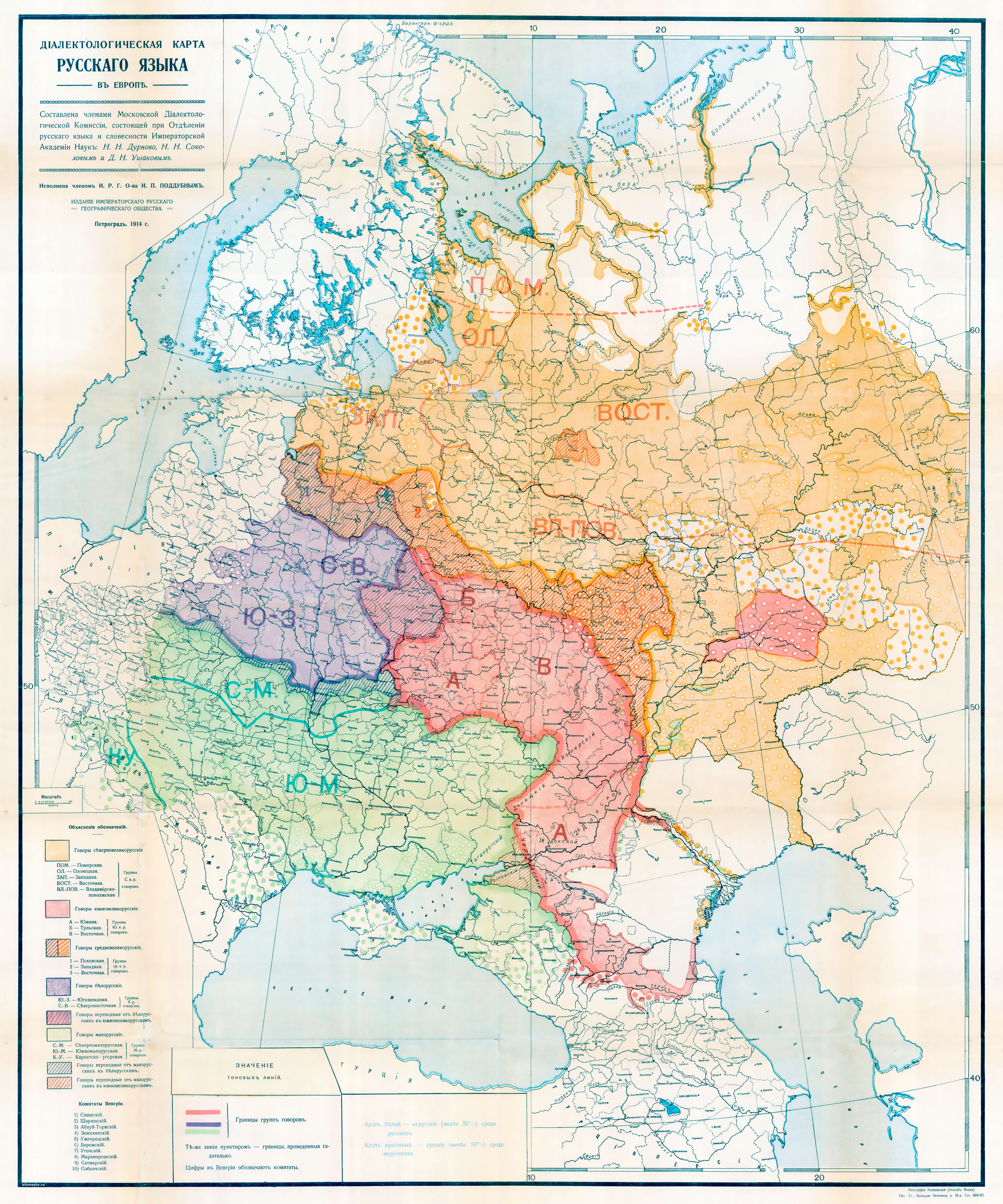
The 1914 dialectological map of the Russian language in Europe highlights five main vernaculars: Northern Great Russian (light orange), Southern Great Russian (red), Central Great Russian (beige and light orange background with light lilac and orange stripes, respectively), Belarusian (purple), and Little Russian (green), along with three transitional dialects: from Belarusian to Southern Great Russian, from Little Russian to Belarusian, and from Little Russian to Southern Great Russian.

The terms "Belarusian people" and "White Ruthenia" ("White Rus'") were not widely known among the population. As the philologist and ethnographer Yefim Karsky wrote in 1903:

At present, the common people in Belarus do not know this name. When asked, "Who are you?" the commoner responds—Ruthenian [pre-reform Russian: русскій, romanized: russkiy], and if he is a Catholic, he calls himself either a Catholic or a Pole; sometimes he might refer to his homeland as Lithuania, or simply say that he is "tutejszy"—local, naturally contrasting himself with someone who speaks Great Russian, as someone who has come to the western region.

Throughout the 18th and 19th centuries in the Northwestern Krai, the developing confessional divide between Orthodox and Catholics significantly influenced ethnic distinctions. This divide led to identity consolidation around religious symbols and centers, reinforcing a Polish-Catholic identity among the minority and promoting an inclusive Russian-Orthodox identity among the majority.

=== Policy implementation and socio-economic changes ===
Russification efforts intensified under Mikhail Muravyov-Vilensky. His successor, Konstantin Kaufman, continued these policies. The goal was to rebuild the West Russian ethnic consciousness among Orthodox Belarusians. West Russian ideologists viewed Kievan Rus’ as the common origin of Russian history, using this narrative to justify a restoration of historical continuity following the period of Polish-Lithuanian rule. As a result, they regarded Belarus as part of Western Russia rather than a separate nation, viewing it as an integral branch of the all-Russian people.

Implementation occurred through public and church parish education, as well as the pastoral service of the Russian Church, integrating confessional bonds that united people in their commitment to Orthodoxy with ethnic ties. This led to a heightened sense of all-Russian national identity among the populace, without excluding the consideration of regional peculiarities and linguistic characteristics as a means of integration in the Northwestern Krai.

After the November Uprising (1830–1831), the Russian authorities intensified measures to reduce Polish cultural influence in the region. One of the most significant steps was the transition of education at all levels in Belarus from Polish to Russian-language instruction. Historian Vyacheslav Nasevich described the Imperial University of Vilna as one of the "reactors" of the Polish national project, and its reorganization aimed to weaken Polish intellectual traditions while instilling loyalty to the Russian state and the Russian Orthodox Church. The university was exclusively for the nobility, as the education system was class-based, which restricted access to higher education for lower social groups.

By the late 19th century, Russian authorities had significantly expanded infrastructure in the Northwestern Krai as part of a broader strategy to integrate Belarusian territories into the empire. Industrial development, improved transportation networks, and agricultural reforms contributed to the region's economic growth. Unlike the Polish perception of Belarus as a peripheral region, the Russian administration regarded it as a key area for economic and political interests.

The active introduction of the Russian language in education and administration was part of the Empire's modernization efforts. It gave Belarusians broader access to education and cultural participation. The population of the five Belarusian provinces grew from 3.3 million in 1863 to 6.5 million in 1897, driven by natural growth and infrastructural enhancements. Urbanization progressed steadily, and literacy rates improved. Between 1860 and 1881, the number of schools in Belarus rose from 576 to 2185. This reflected a strategic effort to strengthen Russian educational and cultural influence.

This period also saw the growth of a distinct Belarusian national consciousness, influenced by socio-economic changes and cultural exchanges within the Empire. The expansion of education, increasing literacy rates, and the development of print media contributed to a greater awareness of Belarusian identity. These processes laid the foundation for the emergence of national movements in the early 20th century.

=== Study of the Belarusian language in the Russian Empire ===
Interest in studying the language of the local population began to emerge in the academic community in the late 19th century. Izmail Sreznevsky and Alexander Potebnja considered Belarusian dialects to be part of the South Russian vernacular. Most researchers at the time were quite skeptical about the prospects of the Belarusian language becoming institutionalized. As noted by the famous ethnographer and collector of Belarusian folklore, Pyotr Bessonov: "The Belarusian oral folk speech will never become a literary, written, and book language."

Despite initial skepticism, the late 19th and early 20th centuries marked a period of budding interest in Belarusian studies. This emerging field was dedicated to exploring the history, culture, traditions, and distinct characteristics of the Belarusian people. Early pioneers like Pavel Shpilevsky and Jan Czeczot began documenting Belarusian oral traditions and folklore, emphasizing the independent nature of the Belarusian language and its cultural heritage. Their contributions laid a solid foundation for subsequent research efforts in this field.

Yefim Karsky, considered the founder of Belarusian linguistics, conducted extensive research that culminated in the publication of his seminal three-volume work "The Belarusians" between 1903 and 1922. This work included detailed studies on Belarusian dialects and featured his "Ethnographic Map of the Belarusian Tribe." Karsky's efforts significantly advanced the academic study of the Belarusian language and culture, highlighting its distinct identity within the broader context of Eastern European studies.

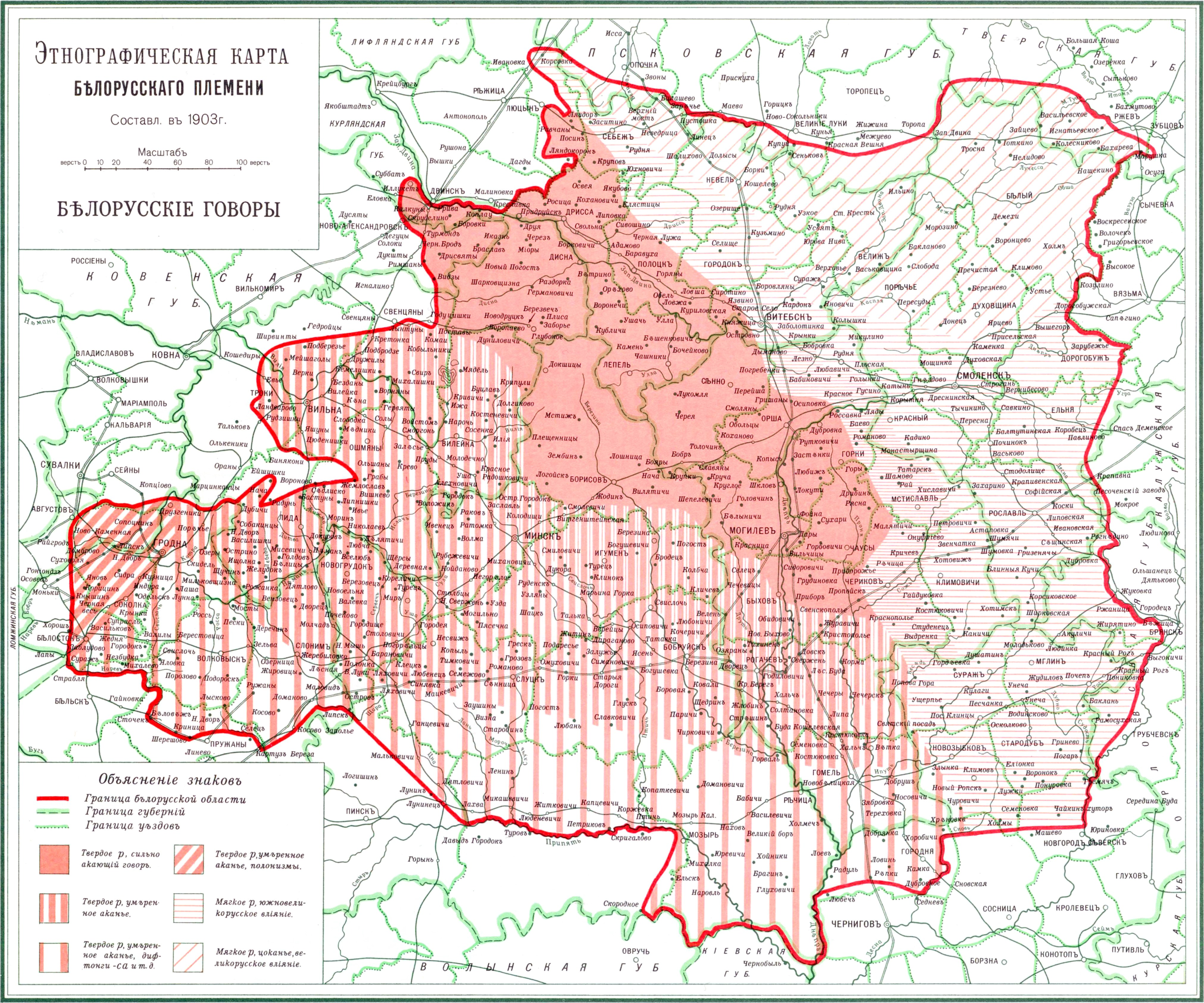
Ethnographic Map by Yefim Karsky, 1903. The author classified the territories of Western Polesia as part of the distribution area of the Little Russian dialect (Ukrainian language), but included significant territories of modern Poland, Lithuania, Latvia, Russia, and Ukraine in the distribution area of Belarusian dialects.

== Soviet Era ==
=== Language policy in 1920-1933 ===
In the 1920s, Belarusization took place in the Byelorussian SSR, aiming to expand the use of the Belarusian language in socio-political and cultural life. This occurred alongside territorial expansions of the republic. In 1924, lands that would become part of the future Mogilev and Vitebsk regions were transferred to the BSSR, and in 1926, the Gomel and Rechitsa okrugs. Most primary schools switched to Belarusian as the language of instruction. Higher education institutions gradually introduced it as well. A 1924 decree established the equality of the republic's four main languages: Belarusian, Russian, Yiddish, and Polish.

According to the 1926 census in the Byelorussian SSR, 80.6% of the population were Belarusians, followed by Jews (8.2%), Russians (7.7%), and Poles (2%). Article 22 of the 1927 Byelorussian SSR Constitution declared Belarusian as the primary language for state, professional, and public institutions, initiating a broad belarusization in all spheres of life, including education where 92% of schools taught in Belarusian during the 1926/27 school year. Similar trends were observed in nearby RSFSR territories like the Smolensk region, which hosted 99 Belarusian schools in the mid-1930s.

=== Language policy in 1933-1989 ===
The phase of Belarusization eventually gave way to a renewed emphasis on Russification, aligning with Soviet policies that favored Russian linguistic dominance across the USSR. Stalin believed that as a unified global socialist economy developed, there would emerge a sort of common language because nations would feel the need to have, alongside their national languages, one common international language.

Candidate of Philological Sciences Igor Klimov writes:

The Bolshevik state, in its unique historical experiment of creating a new society and a new human being, viewed language as an object of special manipulation aimed at achieving certain non-linguistic goals. A key aspect of these manipulations, starting from 1930, was to reinforce Russian influence in the literary language norms of other ethnicities of the USSR. This enhanced cultural homogeneity among the peoples of the Soviet empire, subdued their separatist aspirations, and facilitated their cultural and linguistic assimilation. From the 1930s, the Belarusian language became a victim of this policy, its further development being influenced not by internal necessity or actual usage, but by the internal dynamics of the Soviet state.

In 1958, a school reform was implemented, granting parents the right to choose the language of instruction and determine whether their children should learn the national language. As a result, the number of national schools and their student populations sharply declined. In 1990, the Secretary of the Central Committee of the Communist Party of Belarus for Ideology, Alexander Kuzmin, recalled:

In 1958, there were eight Belarusian-language schools in Minsk. However, when the rule was introduced that parents could choose the language of instruction for their children, we received requests from the parents of only four first-graders asking for their children to be taught in Belarusian. As a result, all eight schools immediately switched to Russian.

For instance, in 1969 in the Byelorussian SSR, 30% of students did not study the Belarusian language, and in Minsk, the figure was 90%. Researchers attribute this phenomenon to parents preferring to educate their children in a language that would facilitate further education in Russian-speaking secondary specialized and higher education institutions, both within Belarus and abroad, ultimately laying the groundwork for a successful career. As Vladimir Alpatov notes:

This led to a paradoxical situation at first glance: many national schools were more supported from above, sometimes out of inertia, while there was a movement from below towards switching to education in Russian (not excluding the study of the mother tongue as a subject).

== Presidency of Alexander Lukashenko ==
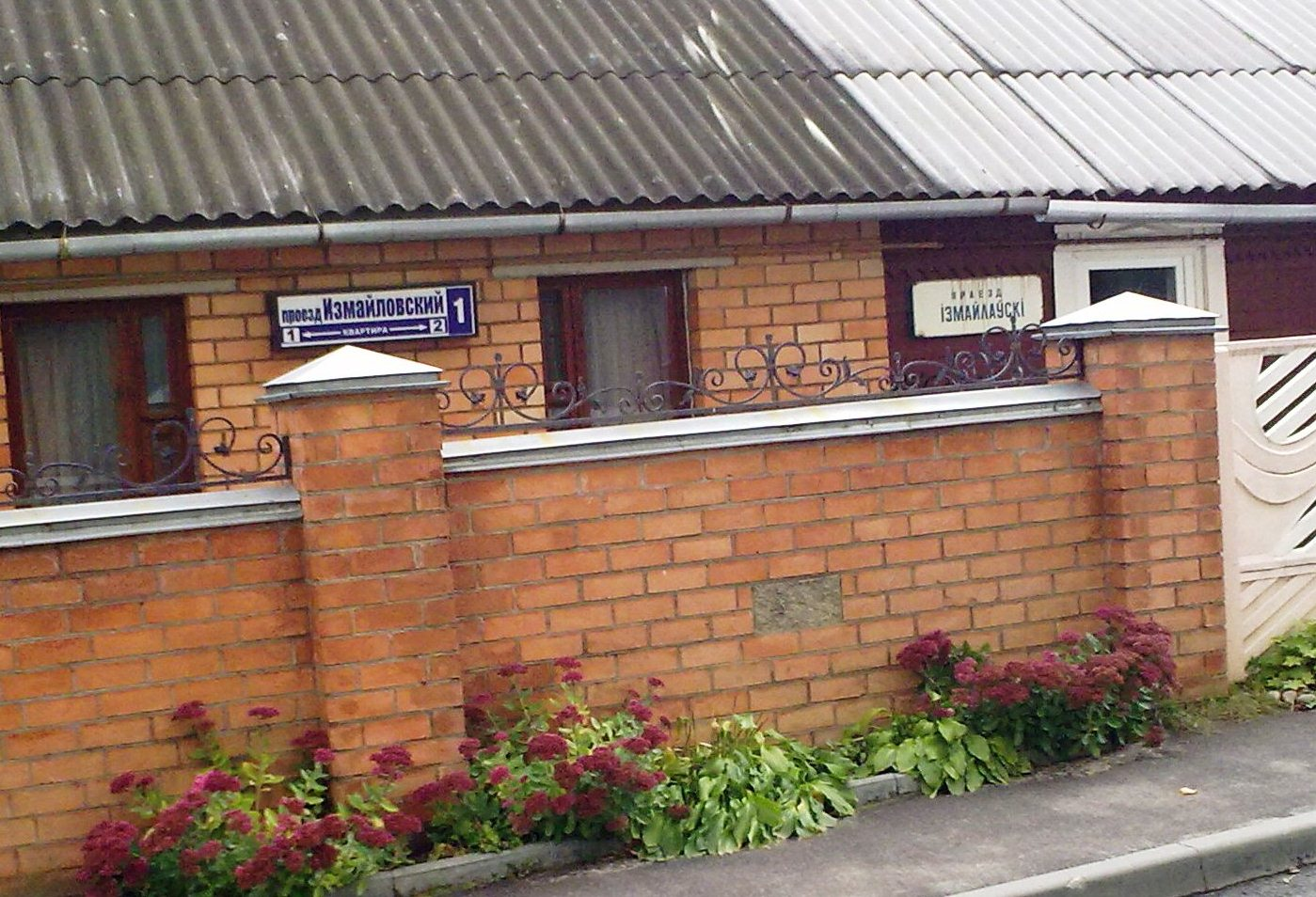
Minsk, Belarus, 2011: old street sign in Belarusian language (right) replaced with new one in Russian language (left).

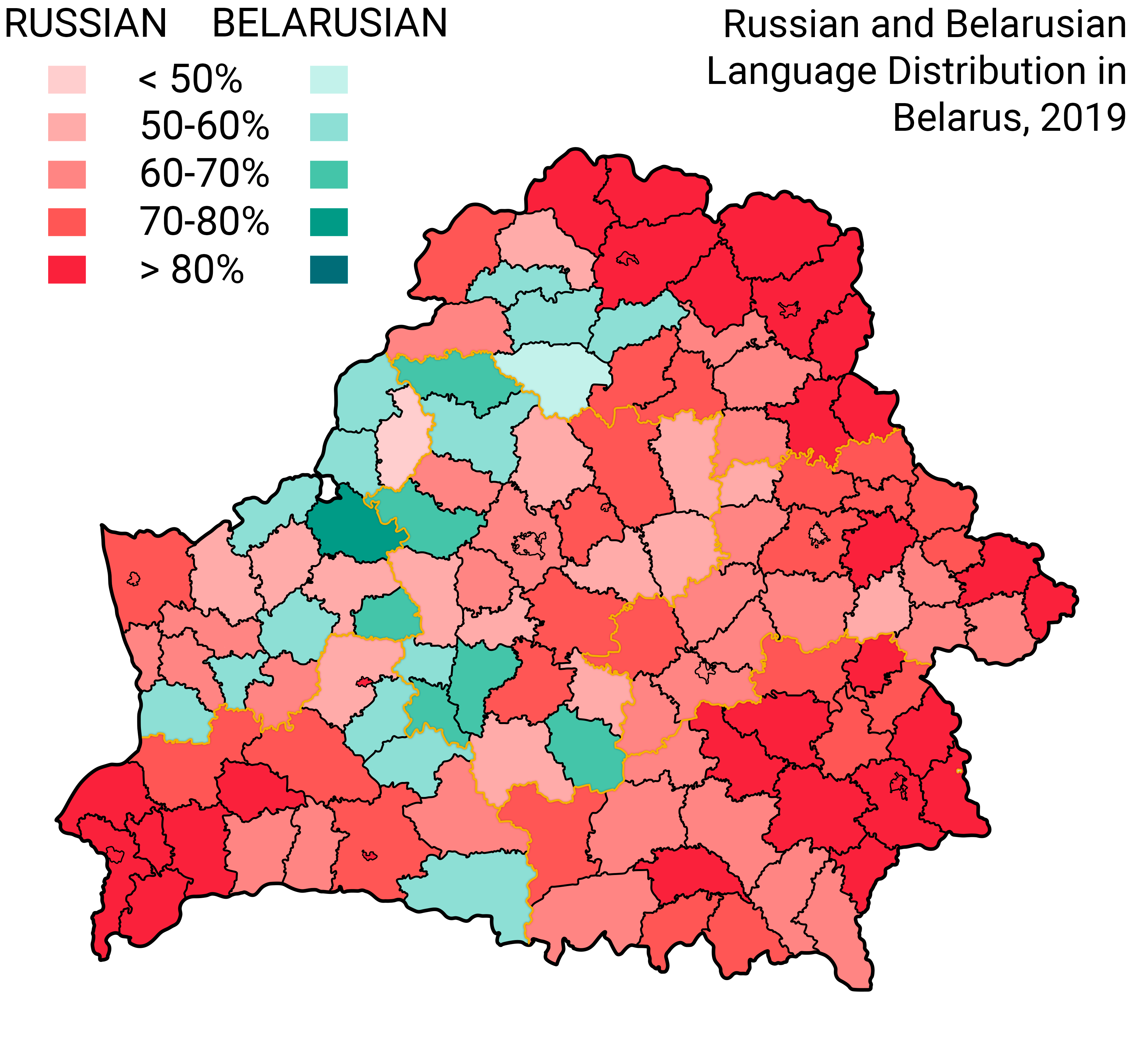
Map showing the distribution of Russian and Belarusian speakers in Belarus, based on 2019 census data.

=== 1990s ===
Belarusian president Alexander Lukashenko has significantly shaped the country's linguistic and cultural policies since coming to power in 1994, with a focus on aligning Belarusian identity more closely with Russian language and cultural norms during the 1990s.

In Minsk city for the 1994–1995 academic year, 58% of students in the first classes of elementary school were taught in the Belarusian language. After the beginning of Lukashenko's presidency in 1994, the number of these classes decreased. In 1999, only 5.3% of students in the first classes of elementary school were taught in the Belarusian language in Minsk.

The 1999 census was the first to include a question about actual language use. The census revealed that although 73.7% of the population identified Belarusian as their native language, only 36.7% spoke it at home. This indicated a decline in everyday use despite its official status.

In the early years of independence, there were efforts to promote Belarusian in education, media, and government. These efforts initially showed progress. However, they began to wane after the 1995 referendum that made Russian a co-official language.

=== 2010s ===
After 2014, President Alexander Lukashenko initiated a policy known as soft Belarusization. This policy aimed to gradually increase the presence of the Belarusian language and reduce the level of Russification in the country. This strategy marked a significant shift towards strengthening Belarusian cultural identity while still maintaining strong ties with Russia.

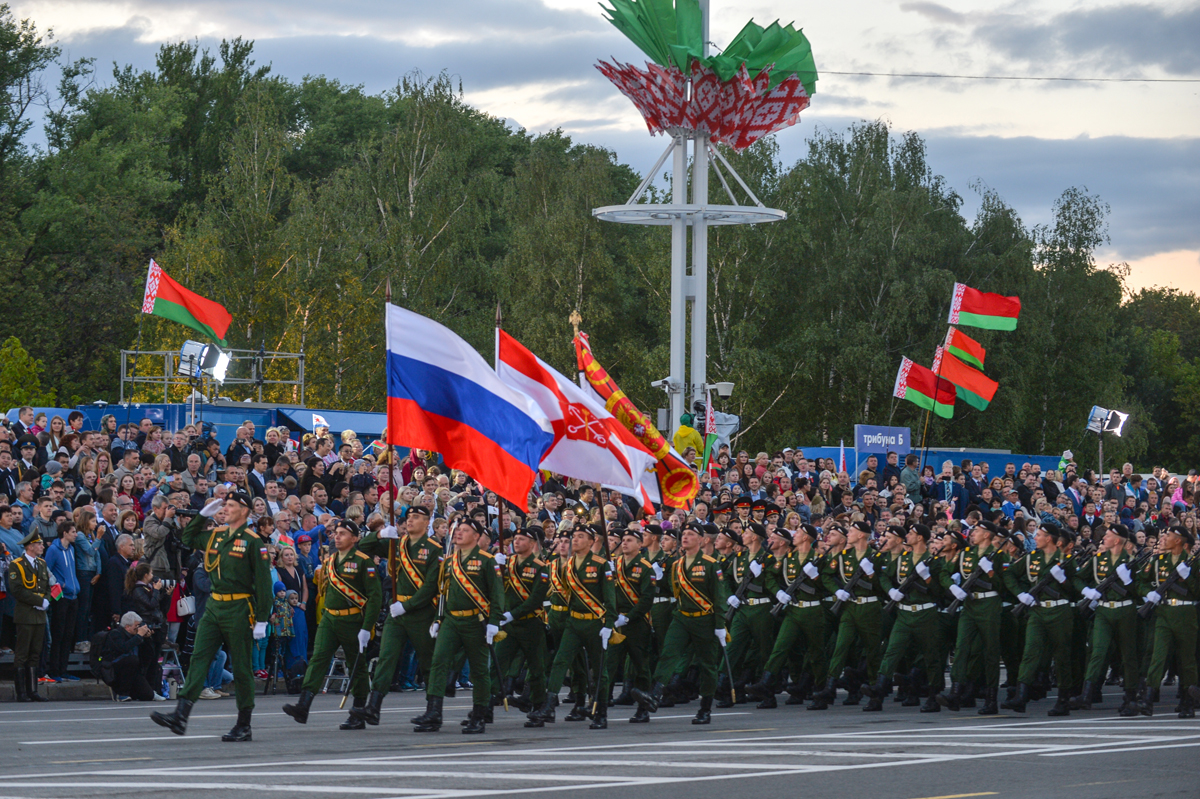
The Russian 4th Guards Tank Division at a military parade dedicated to the Independence Day of the Republic of Belarus, 2019

In the academic year 2016-2017 near 128,000 students were taught in Belarusian language (13.3% of total). The vast majority of Belarusian-language schools located in rural areas that are gradually closed through the exodus of its population to the cities. Each year, there is a closure of about 100 small schools in Belarus, most of which use Belarusian language in teaching. There is a trend of transfer the students of these schools to Russian-language schools. Thus, there is a loss of students studying in Belarusian.

As for the cities, there are only seven Belarusian-language schools, six of which are in Minsk (in 2019). In other words, the capital city, regional and district centers of the Republic of Belarus has seven Belarusian-language schools in total:

1. Gymnasium No. 4 (Kuntsaushchyna street, 18 – Minsk, Frunzyenski District)
2. Gymnasium No. 9 (Siadykh street, 10 – Minsk, Pyershamayski District)
3. Gymnasium No. 14 (Vasnyatsova street, 10 – Minsk, Zavodski District)
4. Gymnasium No. 23 (Nezalezhnastsi Avenue, 45 – Minsk, Savyetski District)
5. Gymnasium No. 28 (Rakasouski Avenue, 93 – Minsk, Leninsky District)
6. Secondary school No. 60 (Karl Libkneht street, 82 – Minsk, Maskowski District)
7. Secondary school No. 4 (Savetskaya street, 78 – Ivanava city)

Number of Belarusian-language schools in the capital city, regional and district centers of Belarus (2019)
Settlement	Number of Belarusian-language schools	Total number of schools	Percentage of Belarusian-language schools
Minsk	6	277	2.17%
Brest	0	37	0%
Vitebsk	0	48	0%
Grodno	0	42	0%
Gomel	0	53	0%
Mogilev	0	47	0%
District centers in total (except the capital and regional centers)	1^{*}	~ 920	0.11%
^{*} in Ivanava (secondary school No. 4)

=== 2020s ===
In the 2020s, the Russification of Belarus intensified, largely driven by the political unrest after the 2020 presidential elections and Belarus's involvement in the Russian invasion of Ukraine. Russia's support during these times resulted in strengthened bilateral cultural initiatives.

This period witnessed a surge in Russian cultural influence across various sectors in Belarus, including the arts, education, and media, highlighted by strategic placements of Russian cultural personnel and the proliferation of Russian cultural centers.

The isolation from European influences, exacerbated by geopolitical alignments, further cemented Belarus's cultural ties with Russia. Joint projects and initiatives between the two nations continued, with increased frequency of events such as joint museum exhibitions, theatrical collaborations, and educational exchanges. These collaborations have underscored a sustained and deepening integration of Belarus into the cultural orbit of Russia.

=== Current state of Belarusian language ===
The Belarusian language, while recognized as the national language, is less used in everyday communication compared to Russian. Efforts continue to revive and promote the Belarusian language through various media including the historically significant newspaper "Nasha Niva" and modern internet platforms.

== Components of Russification ==
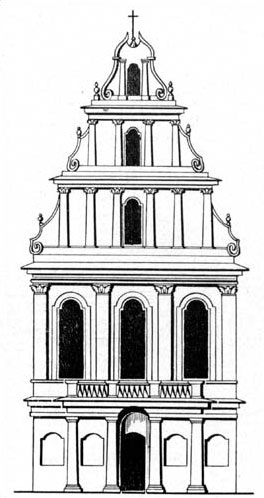
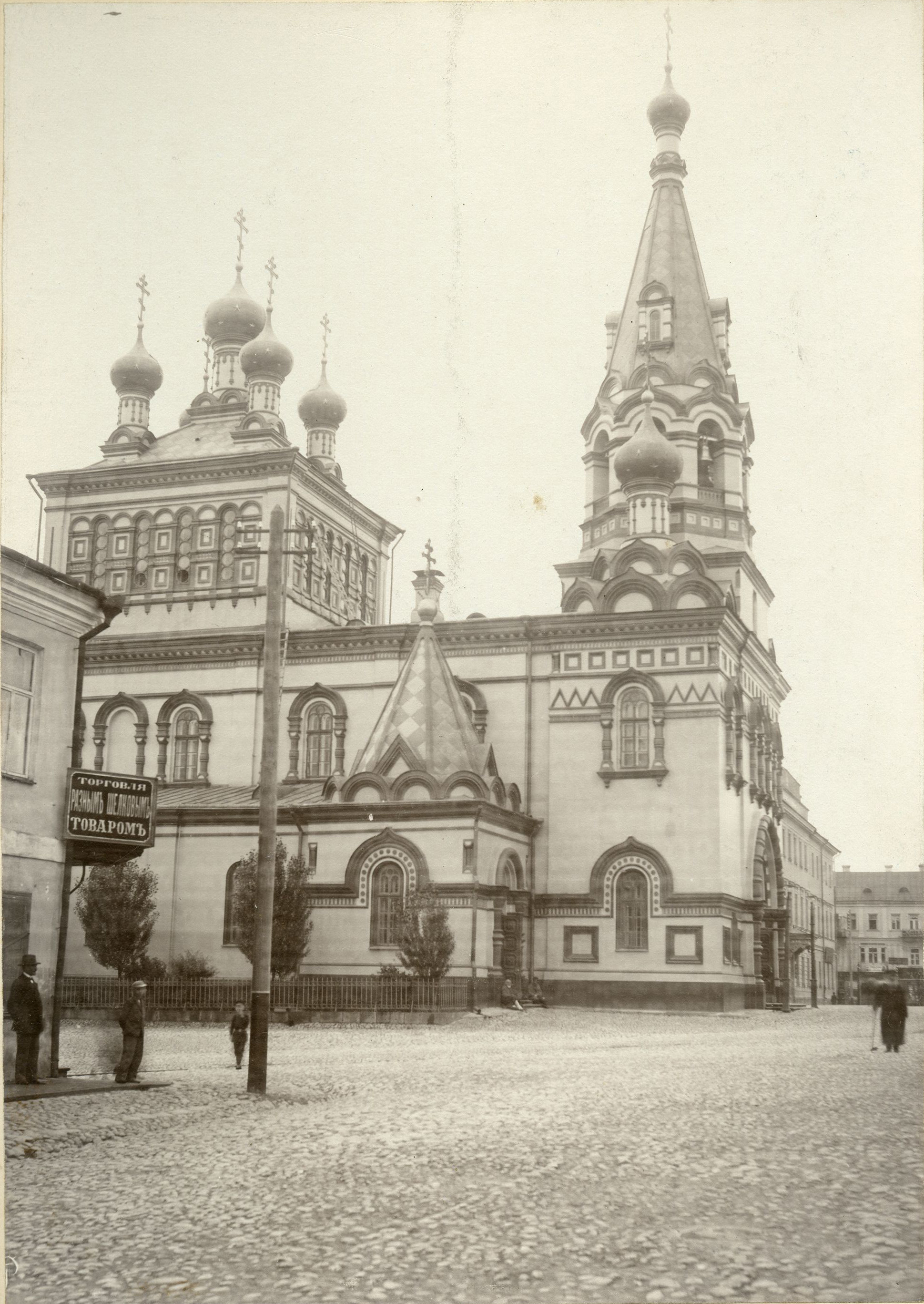
The Greek Catholic Church of the Holy Spirit in Minsk (on the left) and after its reconstruction (on the right) in the Russian Revival architecture style (1893).

The Russification of Belarus comprises several components:

- Russification of education
  - Domination of the Russian language within education in Belarus
- Repressions of Belarusian elites standing on the positions of national independence and building a Belarusian state on the basis of Belarusian national attributes
- Codification of the Belarusian language to bring it closer to Russian
  - Narkamaŭka
- Declaring Russian as the second official language, creating conditions for crowding out the Belarusian language
- Destruction or modification of national architecture
  - List of architectural monuments of the Grand Duchy of Lithuania, destroyed by the authorities of the Russian Empire (in Belarusian)
  - List of historical and architectural monuments of Belarus, destroyed by the Moscow Patriarchate (in Belarusian)
- Renaming of settlements, streets and other geographical objects in honor of Russian figures or according to Russian tradition
- The dominance of Russian television and Russian products in the media space of Belarus
- Lack of conditions for the use of the Belarusian language in business and documents workflow
- Religious suppression and forced conversion
  - Synod of Polotsk

== Chronology ==
- 1772. After the first partition of Poland, part of the ethnic Belarusian lands became part of the Russian Empire. Catherine II signed a decree according to which all governors of the annexed territories had to write their sentences, decrees and orders only in Russian.
- 1773. Catherine II signed another order "On the establishment of local courts", which once again provided for the mandatory use of exclusively Russian language in archives.
- 1787. Catherine II decreed that religious books could be printed in the Russian Empire only in publishing houses subordinate to the Synod of the Russian Orthodox Church, as a result of which Greek-Catholic printing houses were banned.
- 1794. Kościuszko Uprising is crushed by Alexander Suvorov's troops, he receives 25,000 Belarusian serfs as a reward
- 1831. After Emperor Nicholas I of Russia came to power, the November Uprising was suppressed. The Minister of Internal Affairs of Russia, Pyotr Valuyev, prepared a "Special Essay on Means of Russification of the Western Territory" (Russian. Очерк о средствах обрусения Западного края))
- 1832. Mass liquidation of Greek Catholic and Basilian schools, which favored the Belarusian language and culture, was carried out. Strengthening control over education by the Russian Orthodox Church
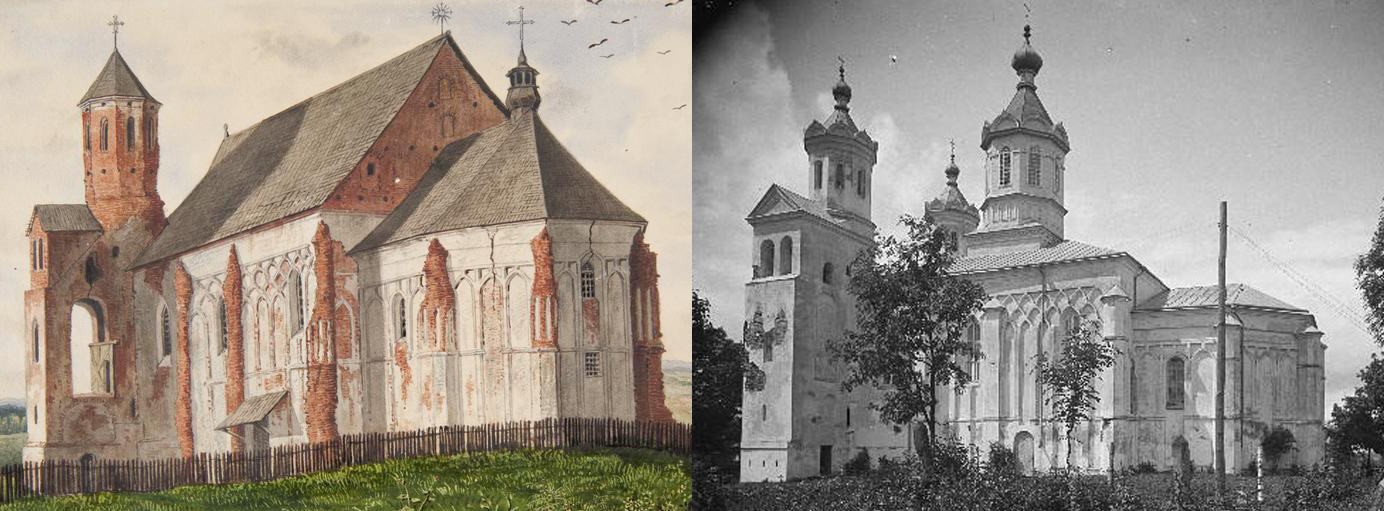
  The St. Boris and Gleb church in Novogrudok (on the left) before reconstruction, and after reconstruction (on the right) in the Russian Revival Architecture style.
- 1852. With the liquidation of the Greek Catholic Church, the mass destruction of Belarusian religious literature began. Joseph Semashko was a personal witness of the burning of 1,295 books found in Belarusian churches. In his memoirs, he proudly reports that over the next three years, two thousand volumes of books in the Belarusian language were burned by his order.
- 1900. the Ministry of Education of Russia set the following task for all schools: "children of different nationalities receive a purely Russian orientation and prepare for complete fusion with the Russian nation"
- 1914. Belarusian people weren't mentioned in the resolutions of the First Russian Congress of Peoples Education. In general, during the entire period of rule in Belarus, the Russian government didn't allow the opening of a single Belarusian school
- 1948. Alesya Furs, an activist of the national liberation movement, was sentenced to 25 years in prison for displaying the Belarusian coat of arms Pahonia
- 1995. After Alexander Lukashenko came to power, the state symbols of Belarus - the white-red-white flag and the historic coat of arms of Pahonia were replaced with modified Soviet symbols, and the national anthem was also replaced. In addition, the Russian language received the status of the second state language (the Russian language is used in all educational institutions and in the mass media), according to UNESCO, the Belarusian language is in danger of disappearing.

== See also ==
- Bibliography of Belarusian history
- Belarusization
- Belarusian national revival
- Belarusian nationalism
- Polonization
- Russification of Ukraine
- Trasianka
