= Human rights issues related to the suppression of the 2020–2021 Belarusian protests =

According to numerous publications citing witnesses and victims of the political suppression of the 2020–2021 Belarusian protests, the events were accompanied by extreme police violence and systematic violations of human rights on all stages of a detention process, including the widespread employment of excessive force and torture, medical assistance denial and rape.

Further reports of the Human Rights Foundation (HRF) and the World Organization Against Torture (OMCT) raised the question of classification of these events as crimes against humanity.

On 1 September 2020, in a statement by the United Nations Human Rights Office, more than 450 documented cases of torture and ill-treatment of detainees were mentioned, including sexual abuse and rape.

== Background ==
On 9 August 2020, in the immediate aftermath of the 2020 Belarusian presidential elections, which were considered by the Belarusian opposition to be falsified, massive gatherings of protesters started to be forming in Minsk and other major cities of Belarus. In the following night, the initially peaceful protests turned into a full-scale confrontation between the protesters and the Belarusian security forces, during which more than 3,000 protestors were arrested. The open confrontation continued through the next two days, which led to a total of around 7,000 arrested protestors. On 12 August 2020, the open confrontation stopped, and peaceful protests resumed.

== Accounts of victims and witnesses ==
According to the OHCHR, both male and female detainees were subjected to rape and other forms of sexual and gender-based violence. Medical records reviewed by OHCHR indicate lesions and other injuries to the male genitalia associated with forcible twisting and rape. Psychological violence, including threats of rape, was also used against detainees.

According to Maxim Solopov, special correspondent of Meduza, who was detained during the 10 August protest and spent two days at the Okrestina Detention Centre, the detainees were ordered to kneel with their hands behind their heads and put their heads on the ground; then, they were continuously beaten by the staff for hours before being put into the cells. The male detainees were ordered to completely undress while lying on the ground, and, on several occasions, loud explosions were heard by Solopov; he believed these could have been detonations of flash-bang grenades. According to Solopov, the tile floor in the detention centre was completely covered with blood, and screams of the beaten detainees could be heard during all his stay there. Solopov also reported that the cell where he and other detainees stayed (45 people in total) had an area of approximately 8 square meters and lacked proper ventilation. On one occasion, 35 female detainees from the cell next to Solopov's, after they screamed to the staff they were suffocating, had dirty water (left from washing the floor) poured over them and threatened that feces would be thrown over them if the screaming did not stop.

According to a Tut.by publication citing various police violence victims and witnesses, the detainees were repeatedly beaten and humiliated by the police and, on many occasions, were refused medical help even if they had open wounds and traumatic brain injuries. Victims reported that detainees were ordered to do squats and had their legs beaten if they failed to fully comply with the order. One of the detainees had a flash-bang grenade put in his underwear, and the police officers who did it threatened him to pull the safety pin and make it look as if the man died from the detonation of a self-made explosive device, mentioning that they "will not have to answer for that". According to a witness, a person suffering from an asthma attack had a foot put on his throat and threatened to be killed without any negative consequences for the police officers involved. The detainees' smartphones were taken by the police officers, and if the detainees refused to tell the unlocking password, they were severely beaten up until they gave the password. According to a witness, a male detainee was undressed by the police and threatened to be sodomized with a nightstick if he refused to give the unlocking password. Female detainees who attempted to help others by telling the police officers about the grave condition of their inmates were brutally dragged by their hair, had their hair cut, and were threatened to be gang-raped should they persist. Other victims reported that the detainees were repeatedly tortured with tear gas and electrocution and, on some occasions, were used as a furniture while standing on their knees, with their heads on the ground.

In a Tut.by interview with the hospitalized police violence victims, it was reported that some of them had been beaten by eight to ten fully equipped police officers at once, while being ordered to lay down and keep their hands behind their heads. Such beatings could last for hours and were accompanied by humiliating acts such as cutting the detainees' hair and ordering them to eat it. The beaten detainees were constantly asked by the police officers who their coordinators were and who had paid them to attend the protest. Some detainees had their underwear torn apart and had truncheons put closely to their rectal area while being beaten and receiving rape threats. According to one of the former detainees, he was beaten to a point where he could not react to the reality anymore and, after it was noticed by the police officers, he was thrown on the concrete floor and repeatedly spilled with cold water, after which he lost consciousness and woke up in a hospital. The former detainees report they were ordered to say they loved OMON (Russian: ОМОН – Отряд Милиции Особого Назначения; Special Purpose Police Unit) and were forced to sing the state anthem of Belarus, while the female detainees were constantly threatened with rape. According to one of the former detainees, a detained female medical volunteer was not beaten but was repeatedly insulted by the police officers until she started crying. If "suspicious" items (such as medical gloves, respirators, knives of any size or even barrettes) were found in the detainees' personal belongings, they were beaten even harder, as they were considered by the police to be the "organizers" and "coordinators" of the protest. According to witness' reports, some people arriving at the detention centre showed signs of severe rubber bullet wounds on their heads and necks and had to be quickly transported to the military hospital or, if their condition was critical, to the closest civilian hospital. Meanwhile, some of the OMON officers present there were beating even the severely wounded detainees, while screaming and threatening the doctors who tried to help them. On several occasions, doctors were refused their requests to release the detainees in grave condition. According to one of the former detainees, when he was released from a detention centre and sent to a hospital, the ambulance that transported him had its tires perforated by unknown men in cars with tinted glass.

According to a Tut.by publication citing an anonymous medical worker of the Minsk military hospital, about 60 patients with gunshot wounds were brought to the hospital on 9 and 10 August, several of them requiring assisted ventilation. One of the patients, a 60-year-old man, related that as he was walking through a crowd of protesters, the police arrived and the crowd started to disperse; as he could not run due to his age, he decided to surrender and raised his arms up. Shortly after that, he received a point-blank shot in his torso. The youngest of the hospitalized detainees was a 16-year-old boy in critical condition: the riot police had thrown an unidentified explosive device under his feet, rendering one of his thighs completely shattered. According to the medical worker, many of the patients brought to the military hospital had severe torso and chest penetrating traumas.

According to a Naviny.by journalist, Alyona Shcherbinskaya, who was detained on 10 August and spent three days at the Okrestina detention centre, the female detainees were subjected there to repeated beating and humiliation by the female staff. Shcherbinskaya reports that a staff member by the name Kristina was among the most vicious ones there: she constantly insulted the detained women, forced them to bend forward and punched them in the stomach, forced them do squats naked and, at some point, "took insoles out of detainees' boots". The female detainees experiencing menstruation were ordered by her to throw away their sanitary napkins, which was justified by the "need to make sure there was nothing forbidden underneath". One of the detained women tore apart her coat and gave the cloth pieces to the inmates in need of a sanitary napkin replacement. However, the pieces didn't last for long and soon had to be replaced with toilet paper, which they ran out of shortly afterwards. According to Shcherbinskaya, the female detainees were taken out of their cells a few times per day and were forced to stay in line along the wall with their legs widely spread, and if the legs weren't considered to be spread wide enough by the staff, the women were punched in the groin area, including the ones on their period, which caused their sanitary napkin replacements to fall off. At the time of Shcherbinskaya's trial, which happened right in the detention centre, she was viciously beat up by Kristina after refusing to sign a falsified detention protocol. Also, Shcherbitskaya recalls that at some point she was taken to a corridor with naked men on their knees, foreheads on the wall and their hands tied behind their backs. The corridor was covered with blood, the male detainees were groaning, and the staff were screaming very loudly.

In an interview to Naviny.by, a former Okrestina detainee reported that at some point an extremely violent beating of a woman was heard through a whole night. According to him, some people were dying inside the cells after the violent beatings, while all requests for medical help from their inmates were getting ignored by the Okrestina staff. On rare occasions, when medics were allowed to examine the suffering detainees and asked for permission to transport them to hospitals, they were refused to do so by OMON officers, who said "Let them die". The same applied to the people with diabetes. On several occasions, the detainees' smartphones were taken away and smashed into their heads. The detainees who refused to provide the unlocking passwords, were tortured by tear gas and had their fingers broken until the password was given. According to the former detainee, around 124 people were kept in a 30 square meters cell, which forced them to stay for up to 24 hours, while they were refused any water for 15 hours. He also noted that no inventorization was carried out during detainees' acceptance to the detention centre, which means their personal belongings, including money, could have been stolen. Some detainees were noticed to walk out of Okrestina without their shoes.

According to the staff of the Minsk Clinical Emergency Hospital, most of the hospitalized protesters suffered from gunshot wounds and blast injuries, with the most severe cases involving amputations of the traumatized limbs. The detainees transported to the hospital from the Okrestina detention centre were diagnosed with closed-head injuries, concussions, and severe head and torso bruises. In some cases, severe arm fractures were registered, which, according to the medics, "looked as if they had been made on purpose". Some of the hospitalized male detainees were diagnosed with rectal fractures.

On 11 August, Artyom Vazhenkov and Igor Rogov, members of the Open Russia organization who had come to Minsk to monitor the election, were detained by the police and brought to the Okrestina detention centre. In his interview to Radio Free Europe, entitled "We are re-educating you scum!", Vazhenkov related the numerous abuses to which he and the other detainees, some of them underage, were subjected by the detention centre's staff. Vazhenkov reported that each time the detainees asked for food or water or said they needed to go to the bathroom, they were met with verbal and physical aggression on the part of the centre's staff. The detainees were humiliated by being forced to undress to their underwear and stay in this condition both in the cell and during the trials, which were performed directly at the detention centre.

According to one of the former Okrestina detainees, shortly after the detention, people had their clothes cut (including, in some cases, the underwear) and were numerically marked with a marker pen by the police, after which they were only referenced to by their assigned numbers. Some of the police officers involved made drawings on the detainees' bodies.

In a Current Time TV video, entitled "They Treated Me Like An Animal", several released Belarusian detainees provided personal accounts of police abuse, which involved gang-rape and kill threats, severe beatings, tortures with cold water, food and water denial for more than 48 hours and forcing to sign a detention protocol under threats of torture.

According to a 16-years-old former detainee, who had to be hospitalized in a state of induced coma after he was severely beaten and tortured by electrocution, the detainees were ordered to sing the anthem of OMON and, if they refused, they had truncheon hammered in their throats, and, on one occasion, a detainee was anally raped with a truncheon.

A former detainee who was initially transported to the Savyetski District RUVD (Russian: РУВД – Районное Управление Внутренних Дел; District Department of Internal Affairs) reported that around 80 people were lined along a wall there and were forced to stay for 24 hours with their hands behind their heads, including the ones with broken hands, who were refused medical attention. According to him, the detainees were beaten there and threatened by police officers with execution by shooting, which they claimed they had direct orders to perform, and were allowed to sit only during a night for a total of 15 minutes. According to another former detainee who was initially transported to the Partyzanski District RUVD, the detainees there (around 30 in total) were severely beaten, taken to a basement and ordered to sing the anthem of Belarus on multiple occasions. A female former detainee who was transported to the Maskowski District RUVD reported that during the early stages of detention she was repeatedly beaten, accused of being a "protest coordinator" and demanded to name the people who paid her. In the RUVD, she was taken to a hall where the floor was covered with blood and vomit, was ordered to lay down and threatened to have her dreadlocks cut off. During interrogation by 7 police officers, she was demanded to tell who paid her for the subversion and at some point was knocked out of a chair, ordered to lay down and was beaten with truncheons each time her answers weren't considered satisfactory. After the interrogation, she was taken to a hall with about 40 or more detainees and had her clothes marked with an aerosol paint, which, as she learned later, was a message to other police officers meaning she was one of the most active protesters. At the Okrestina detention centre, she, along with other 35–40 women, was put in a four-people cell where she spent another 3 days. Another female former detainee reported that at some point she was taken to a six-people cell with 50 other detainees who were refused food and had no access to clean water. During her last night there, the Okrestina staff knocked on the cell door once in an hour, preventing the detainees from sleeping. The detainees there were nearly suffocating and restrained from talking in order to preserve as much oxygen as possible. When she was transported to a detention centre in Zhodzina, she received food for the first time in three days and heard local staff referring to Okrestina as Auschwitz concentration camp. Another female former detainee from Okrestina, who was arrested by 10 OMON officers as an independent observer during the elections and was put in a four-people cell with 35 other women, reported that all the detainees' requests for more air were met with an opened door and a splash of water. The detainees there were constantly humiliated and refused means of personal hygiene, such as sanitary napkins. During the night, when male detainees were taken out of their cells, she heard sounds of severe beatings and screams, and, in the morning, saw the corridor walls of the Okrestina covered with blood.

Sergei Dylevsky, a steel worker at the Minsk Tractor Works who helped take protesters released from detention to a hospital, recalled that one of them had lost an eye after being beaten at the facility. This evidence angered Dylevsky and led to his joining the Coordination Council.

On 11 August, Karina Malinovskaya from Grodno was detained by plainclothes men near her home and taken to the Grodno's Leninsky District RUVD where she was hard punched in the stomach while being pregnant. Despite informing the RUVD staff about her condition and the emergence of a stomach pain, she was initially denied medical help and was threatened to be beaten and have her other child taken away by the government in case she didn't comply with the police' orders. After about three hours, she was checked by the RUVD medical personnel who doubted the fact of her pregnancy and called an emergency only after Malinovskaya reminded them of their legal liability. At the city hospital, her pregnancy was confirmed, and the medical staff there insisted on immediate hospitalization, which the escorting police officers considered to be possible only with Malinovskaya being handcuffed to a bed. Presented with an alternative option of being set free in the morning after being transported to a local detention center and going through her trial, Malinovskaya agreed on a condition that she would not be beaten again. At the detention center, Malinovskaya was not beaten, but was brought to a mass beating of men, which she was forced to watch by the center's staff informed of her condition. After some time of this torture, which Malinovskaya compared to "something from a movie about the Gestapo", her body started to severely tremor, which frightened the guards and made them call an emergency. In a hospital, Malinovskaya was diagnosed with a cyst rupture and underwent a surgery, which eventually resulted in a pregnancy loss. In the aftermath, Malinvoskaya was contacted by the RUVD and demanded to sign a detention protocol describing her as "swearing, screaming and attacking people", which she refused. Eventually, she was sentenced to an administrative fee for participation in a "chain of solidarity" on 14 August.

== Violations of arrest and court procedures ==
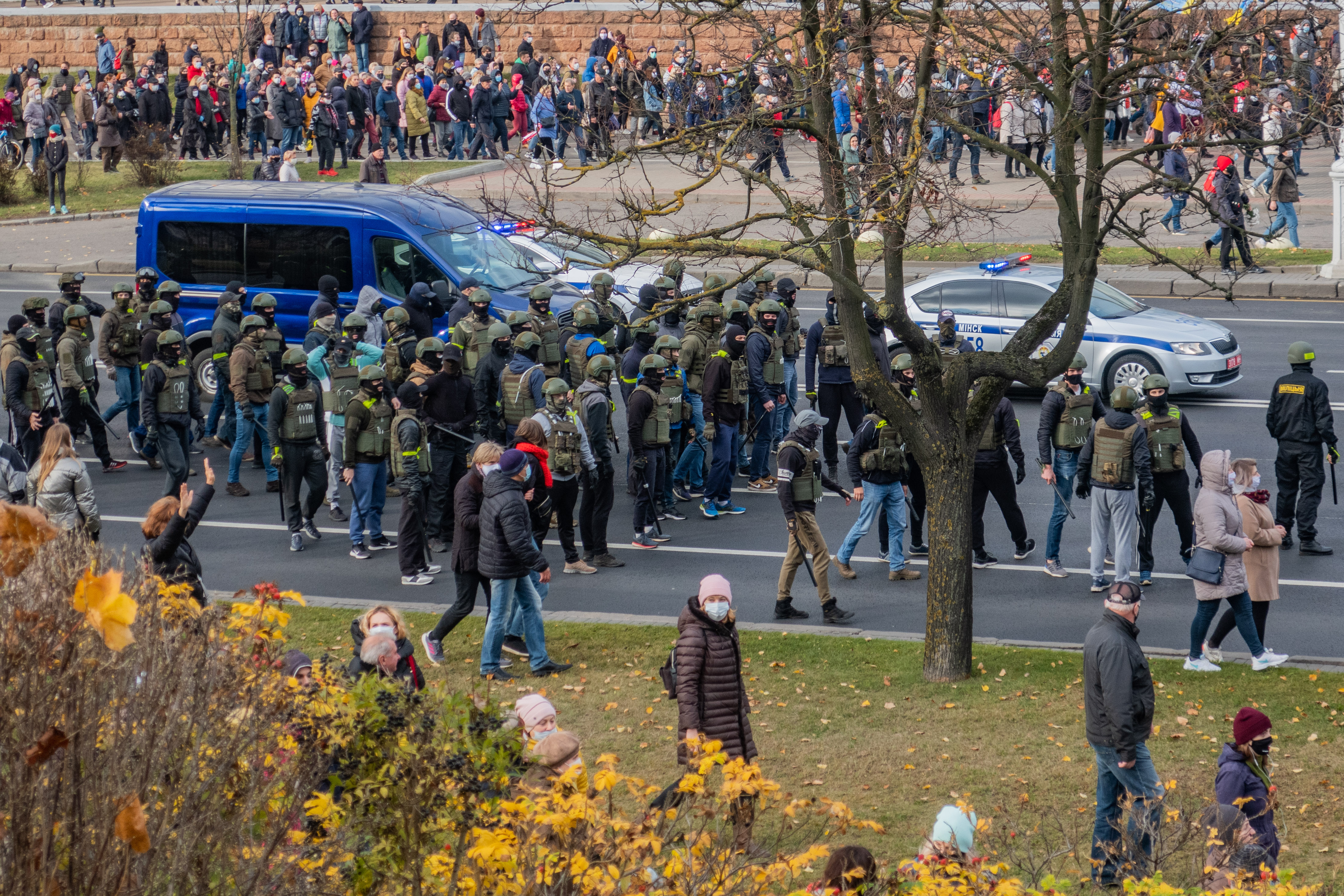
A group of unidentified armed troopers in casual clothes, bulletproof vests and helmets with police batons (on the road). Minsk, 1 November 2020.

=== Arrest procedure violations ===
Arrests of the protesters were often conducted by people wearing masks or balaclavas and without IDs, with some of them wearing civilian clothes and bulletproof vests. Agents in civilian clothes, unofficially called "the quiet men" (Russian: тихари — tikhari), not only arrested protesters in collaboration with the government troops, but also beat people, made operational video shooting and testified in courts. Their affiliation was often impossible to establish. The employment of plainclothes police was admitted by the minister of internal affairs, Yury Karayeu, while, according to Belarusian human rights activists, the only possible legal justification for such measures was special investigation activity. They also note that the OSCE guidance document on mass political meetings requires policemen to be easily identifiable.

Numerous reports of arrests without introducing (name, rank, institution of the officer) and explanation of reasons of arrest were reported, despite the direct demand of the Belarusian law. Ministry of Internal Affairs stated that all such cases were justified by the "urgent needs". The Arrest of Maria Kalesnikava was sometimes compared with abduction.

Forced checks of passer-by's mobile phones were widely practiced without the prosecutor's or court orders. If the police officers or troops found photos from the protest rallies or subscription to anti-Lukashenko Telegram channels, the inspected person could be detained and/or beaten.

Some non-protesters, including passers-by, bicyclists, journalists and election observers, were detained at the polling stations.

=== Court procedure violations ===
Many people detained in the first days after the election stated that their trials were extremely simplified and short, often being conducted right at the detention center. Some detained people were forced by the police officers with batons to kneel in front of judges and not to look at them. In some cases, names of the judges weren't announced, and the judgment was read out without the judge. Many trials were held behind closed doors.

Police reports (protocols) were often reported to be full of mistakes, including confusion of names, places and circumstances, but the objections about these mistakes were seldom taken into consideration by the judges. It was reported that those who didn't agree with the police reports and refused to sign them could be beaten. An election observer who was detained at the polling station, was convicted on the basis of the report claiming that 2 hours after the detention she was shouting anti-government slogans in another place in Minsk. A detained Russian tourist was successively charged for protesting in two different parts of Minsk at the same time. At least three similar cases involving journalists were known: they were first charged on the basis of one police report, but after they argued that they were in another place at the stated time of detention, they were charged and convicted on the basis of another report. A woman in Minsk was found guilty with a social network photo acting as the only evidence.

Prosecution witnesses, if any, testified remotely (via video communication services), anonymously or with changed names, and their faces were sometimes covered with mask or balaclavas. One of the charged journalists claimed that the witness who testified against him was given hints by a man nearby. In September, minister of internal affairs, Yury Karayeu, offered the Belarusian parliament to legalize such practice in order to increase the security of the policemen.

Defense lawyers reported obstruction by the government officials and violation of their rights, including intentional concealment of their clients' location and unannounced beginnings of trials.

On 11 September, a judge of Zavodski District in Minsk, Zhanna Khvoinistskaya, stated in a judgment that having a contract with a lawyer was the evidence of guilt.

== Internal and international reactions ==
- On 14 August, Alexander Barsukov, the deputy minister of Internal Affairs, denied the employment of torture by the security forces. On 16 August, Yury Karayeu, the Minister of Internal Affairs, stated that all cases of abuse of authority were going to be investigated after the stabilization of the situation in the country. On 17 August, Alexander Lukashenko, president of Belarus, admitted some of the Okrestina detainees were beaten, but noted that those were only the ones who attempted to attack the Okrestina staff.
- On 20 August, Mike Pompeo, the United States Secretary of State, issued a statement condemning the violence used against peaceful protesters and abuse of the detainees.
- (United Nations) In a 21 August statement by the UN High Commissioner for Human Rights, it was noted that, despite the majority of the detainees being released, serious concerns about the missing protestors and the ones accused of criminal acts were still there. The statement underlined the lack of information about the detainees' status and called for immediate release of the unlawfully detained persons.

== See also ==
- List of deaths related to the 2020–2021 Belarusian protests
- Persecution of Wikipedia editors in Belarus
