= Vladimir Kumets =

Belarusian pro-democracy activist (born 1988)

Vladimir Kumets Уладзімір Кумец Владимир Кумец
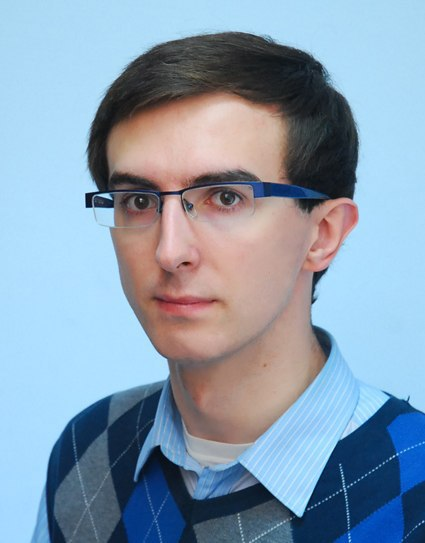
- Press-secretary of the "Revolution through social networks" civil campaign
- Born: December 29, 1988 (age 37); Minsk, Byelorussian SSR
- Occupation: Press-secretary of the "Revolution through social networks" civil campaign

Vladimir Vladimirovich Kumets (Belarusian: Уладзімір Уладзіміравіч Кумец) is a Belarusian dissident and political activist. In September 2011 he was recruited by the KGB against his will and forced to leave Belarus. He is a press secretary for the Revolution Through Social Networks civil campaign and a Deputy Chairman of the Integration Bridge foundation in Poland.

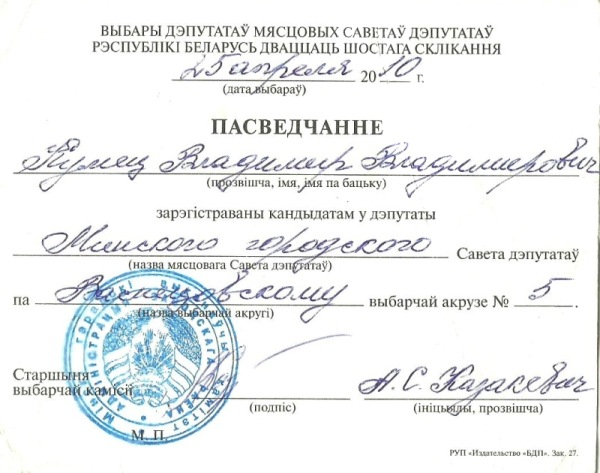

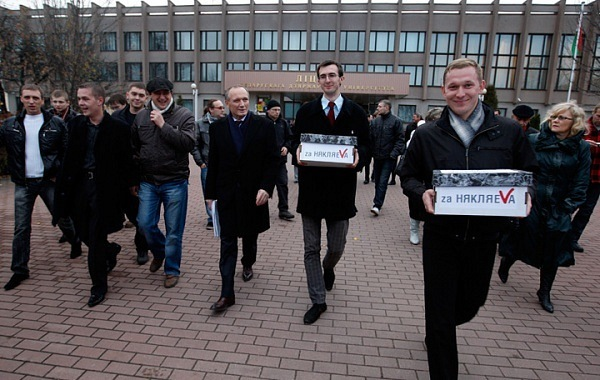

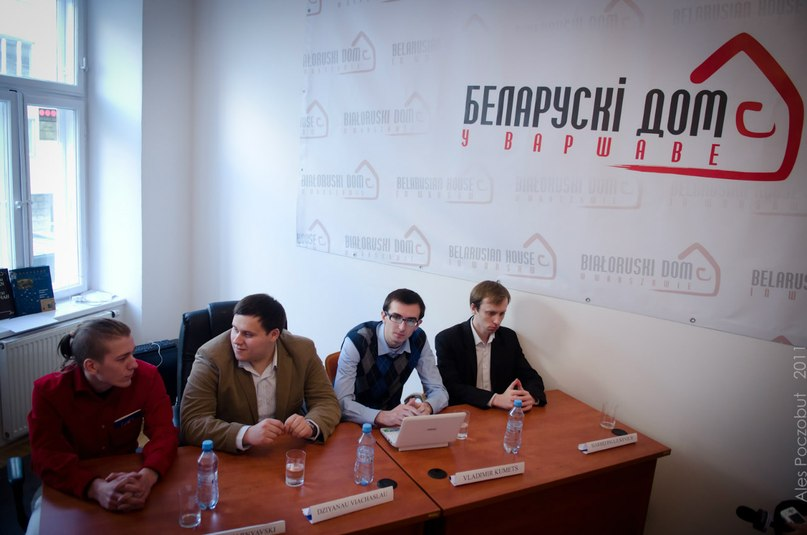

== Early activism ==
From 2008 to 2009 Kumets was a member of the European Belarus civil campaign. In September 2009 he became the Deputy Chairman of the Future Movement association. In the 2010 Belarus presidential election he ran Uladzimir Nyaklyayew’s campaign in the Lyeninski District, and was also an unsuccessful candidate for the Minsk City Council. The results were apparently falsified.

== Expulsion ==
Kumets studied at the Linguistic Gymnasium 14 in Minsk, in the International Relations Department of the International Humanitarian-Economic Institute. In November 2010 he was expelled, apparently for participating in Nyaklyayew's campaign. The European Commission condemned the expulsion, finding it politically motivated. The rector of the institute Tamara Alpeyeva has subsequently been added to the list of people and organizations sanctioned in relation to human rights violations in Belarus. In a meeting on November 10 the head of the institute reportedly promised Nyaklyayew that Kumets would be reinstated in January 2011, but Kumets left the country to avoid prosecution.

== Coercion ==
When Kumets returned to Belarus in September 2011 a team of Belarusian secret service (KGB) agents broke into his apartment. They arrested him and his brother under Article 186 of the Criminal Code (the threat of murder, causing grievous bodily harm or destruction of property). At a Frunzenski District police station Kumets was intimidated and coerced into signing an agreement. Under the agreement he would have to cooperate with intelligence agencies, discredit opposing parties, reproduce information from the Ministry of Foreign Affairs of Poland, and provide information about the activities of the Revolution Through Social Networks campaign. He and his brother spent the night in jail and were interrogated on camera before being released. Upon arrival in Poland he was contacted twice a week and asked to report on opposition activities. After the criminal cases on him and his brother were closed in November, Kumets held a press conference in Warsaw about the experience and indicated that he would not be working for the intelligence agencies. The next day he got e-mails threatening revenge for the disclosure. As of 2012 agents still send notices to Kumet's home address and interrogate his parents in regard to his whereabouts.

== Continued activism ==
Kumets now lives and works in Poland and continues his political activities. In February 2012 he and his colleagues started the public initiative We Demand Answers! and he serves as a press secretary for Revolution Through Social Networks.. The campaign regularly organizes protesters in the centers of Belarusian cities, and aims to unite political activists who've been coercively recruited by the KGB, "to fight for their constitutional rights and to urge those responsible to justice."
