= Sharshuny =

Sharshuny (Belarusian: Шаршуны) or Shershuny (Russian: Шершуны) may refer to the following places in Belarus:

- Sharshuny (agrotown), an agrotown in Minsk District, Minsk Region
- Sharshuny (village), a village in Minsk District, Minsk Region
