= Uručča (disambiguation) =

Uručča (sometimes transliterated Uruchcha) is a Belarusan toponym, and may refer to:

- Uručča, a microdistrict in Minsk
  - Uručča (Minsk Metro), a station serving it
- Uručča (village), near Bryansk
