= Kastrychnitski District =

District of Minsk, Belarus

Kastrychnitski District Кастрычніцкі раён (Belarusian) Октябрьский район (Russian)
- District
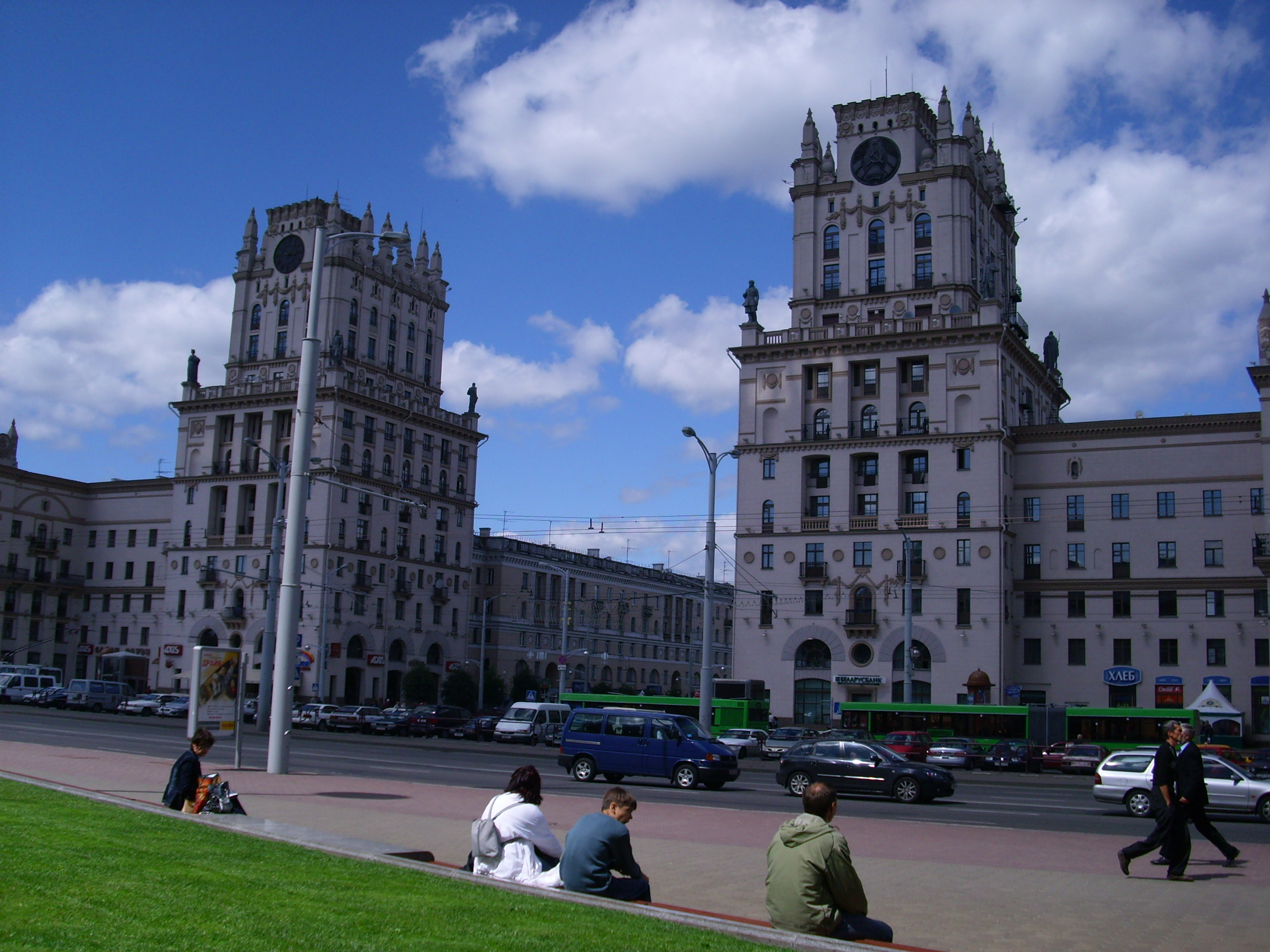

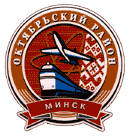
- Coat of arms

- Coordinates: 53.85°N 27.5333°E
- Country: Belarus
- Municipality: Minsk

Area
  - Total: 19.27 km^{2} (7.44 sq mi)

Population (2023)
  - Total: 170,527
  - Density: 8,849/km^{2} (22,920/sq mi)
- District number: 7
- Website: Official website

Kastrychnitski District or Kastryčnicki District (Belarusian: Кастрычніцкі раён, romanized: Kastryčnicki rajon; Russian: Октябрьский район, romanized: Oktyabr'skiy rayon) is an administrative division of the city of Minsk, the capital of Belarus. It was named after the October Revolution. As of 2023, it has a population of 170,527.

== Geography ==
The district is situated in the central and south-western part of the city and borders the Lyeninski and Maskowski districts.

== Transport ==
The main railway station of Minsk is located in the district. The district is also crossed by the subway and tram networks. It is also crossed by the MKAD beltway.
