= Tsentralny District, Minsk =

District of Minsk, Belarus

Tsentralny District Цэнтральны раён (Belarusian) Центральный район (Russian)
- District
- Coat of arms

- Coordinates: 53.9510°N 27.5102°E
- Country: Belarus
- Municipality: Minsk

Area
  - Total: 22 km^{2} (8.5 sq mi)

Population (2023)
  - Total: 128,151
  - Density: 5,800/km^{2} (15,000/sq mi)
- District number: 1
- Website: Official website

Tsentralny District or Centraĺny District (Belarusian: Цэнтральны раён, romanized: Centralny rajon; Russian: Центральный район) is an administrative division of the city of Minsk, the capital of Belarus. Its name means "Central District" due to its position partly in the centre of the city. As of 2023, it has a population of 128,151.

== Geography ==
The district is situated in central and north-western area of the city and borders with Savyetski, Partyzanski, Leninsky, Maskowski, and Frunzyenski districts.

== Transport ==
Tsentralny is served by the subway and tram networks. It is also crossed by the beltway "MKAD".

== See also ==
- Nemiga (Minsk Metro)
