= Harani, Minsk district =

Village in Minsk Region, Belarus

Harani Гарані (Belarusian) Горани (Russian)
- Village
- Location within Belarus
- Coordinates: 53°55′30″N 27°10′20″E
- Country: Belarus
- Region: Minsk Region
- District: Minsk District

Population (2010)
  - Total: 128
- Time zone: UTC+3 (MSK)

Harani (Belarusian: Гарані; Russian: Горани, romanized: Gorani) is a village in Minsk District, Minsk Region, Belarus. It is administratively part of Harani selsoviet. It is located about 15.5 kilometres (9.6 mi) from the Minsk Ring Road, west of the capital Minsk. In 2010, it had a population of 128.
