= Syerabranka, Minsk =

Coordinates: 53°51′47″N 27°36′14″E

Syerabranka Серабранка • Серебрянка
- Microdistrict
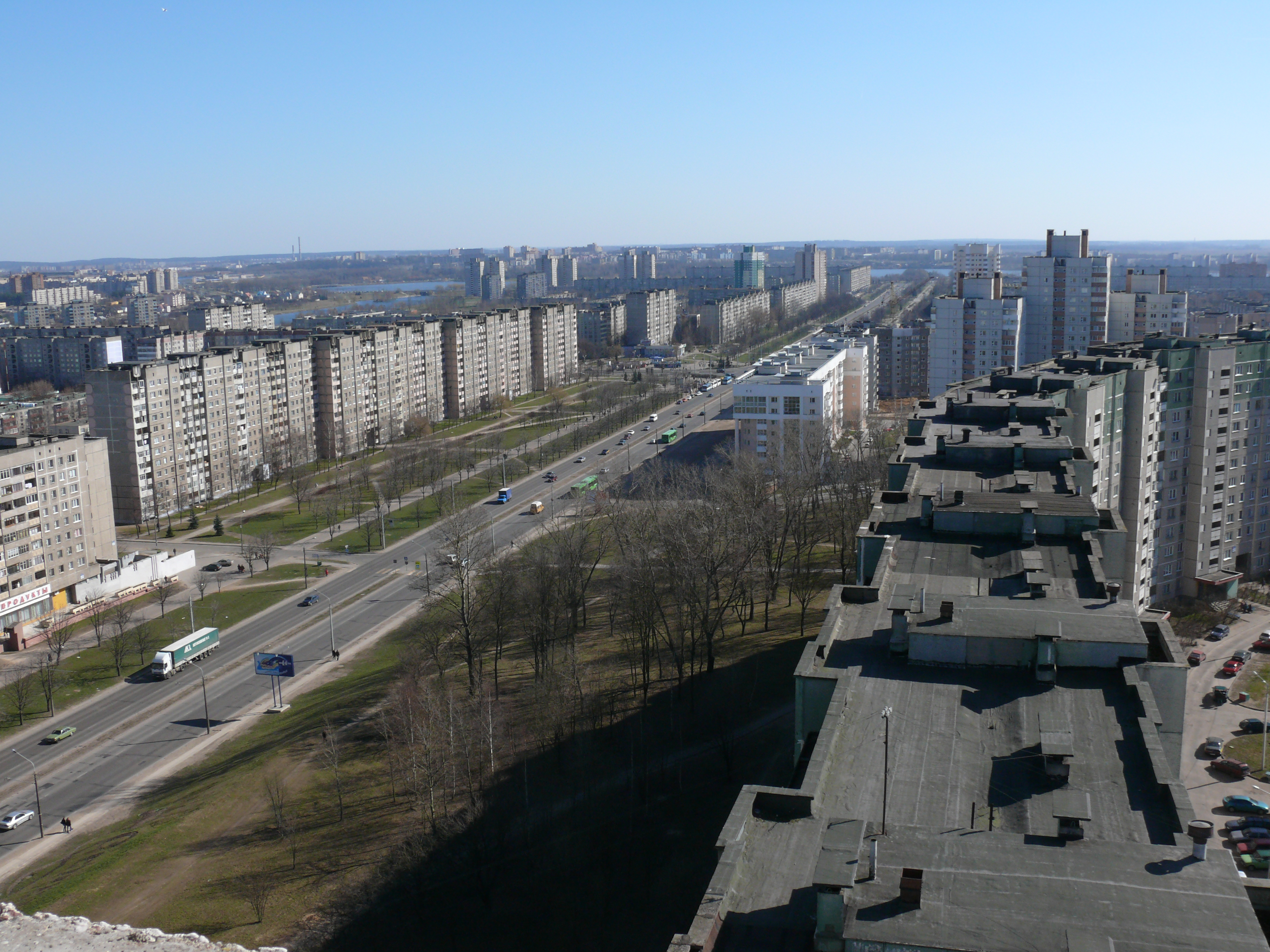
- Interactive map of Syerabranka
- Country: Belarus
- City: Minsk
- Rayon: Lyeninski District
- Founded: 1551

Area
  - Total: 4.6 km^{2} (1.8 sq mi)

Population
  - Total: 135,000
- Postal codes: 220085, 220094, 220095, 220111, 220101

Syerabranka (Belarusian: Серабранкa) or Serebryanka (Russian: Серебрянка), is a residential microdistrict in Lyeninski District in southeastern Minsk, Belarus.
