= Uručča =

Microdistrict in Minsk

Coordinates: 53.9458°N 27.6897°E

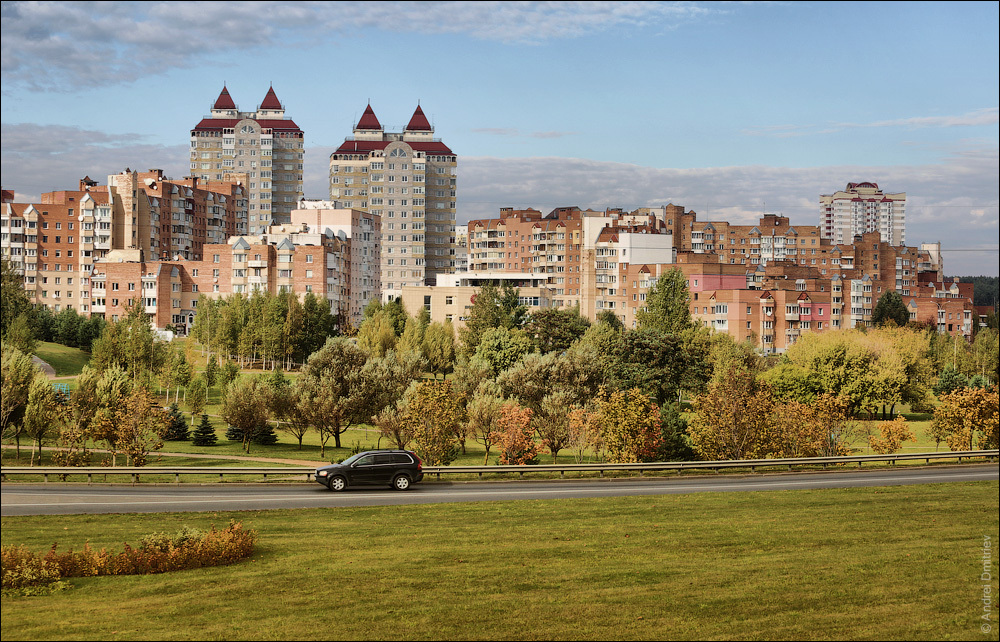
Northern Uručča

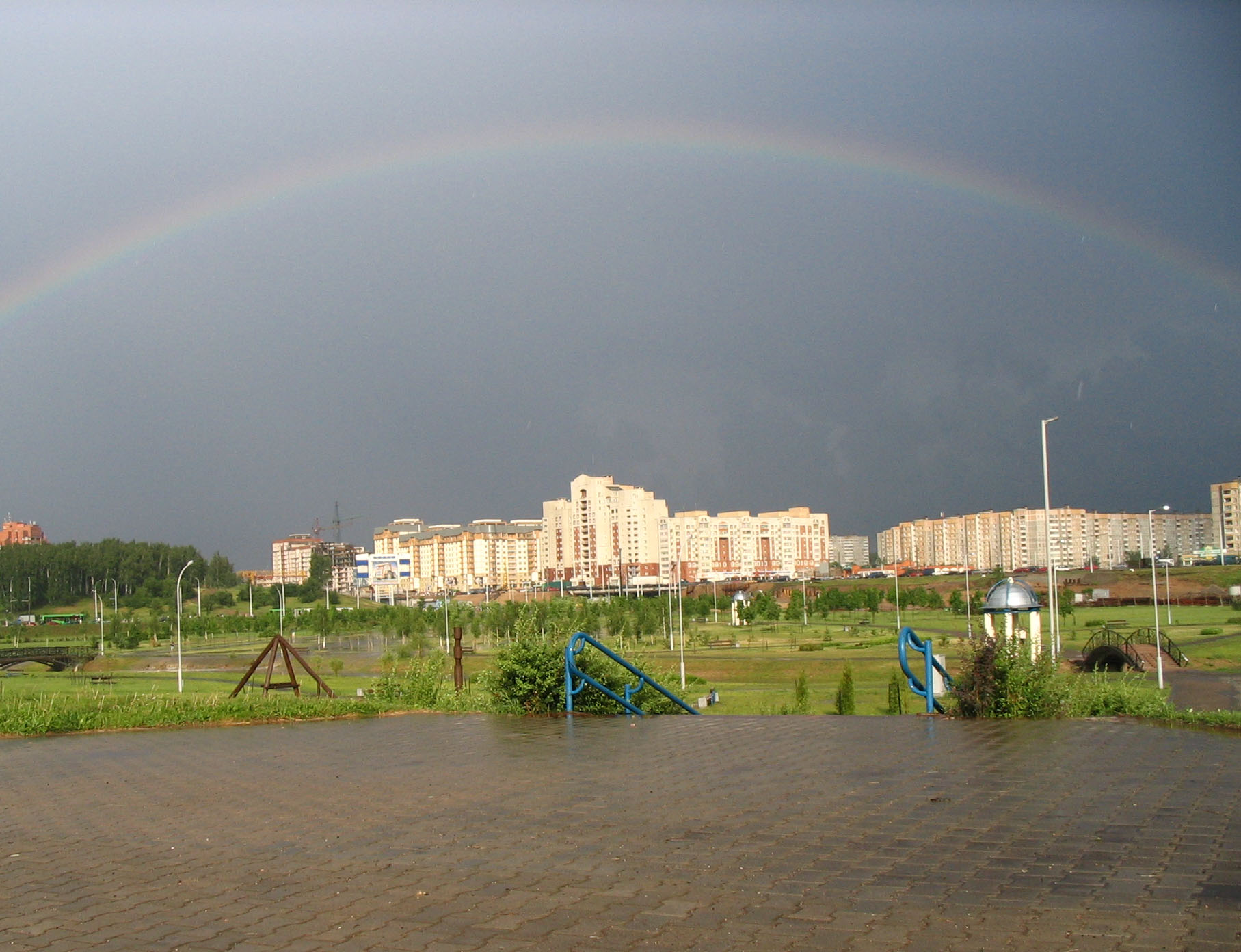
Uručča Park

Uručča, (also referred to as Uruchcha or Uruch'ye) (Belarusian: Уручча, Russian: Уручье, romanized: Uruch'ye; translation into English: Brookside) is a microdistrict in the north-eastern part of Minsk. It was founded on the place of former Uručča village in the early 1980s. Uručča divided into six parts with corresponding numbers. The metro station of the same name was opened on November 7, 2007. It is the first station outside the Minsk Automobile Ring Road.

The following streets are in the neighborhood of Uručča : Rusijanava, Šuhajeva, Nikifarava, Šafarnianskaja, Haradzieckaja, Hintaŭta, Ložynskaja, Astrašyckaja, Uručskaja, Starynaŭskaja.

== See also ==
- Uručča (Minsk Metro)
- Administrative divisions of Minsk
