= Pyershamayski District =

District of Minsk, Belarus

Pyershamayski District Першамайскі раён (Belarusian) Первомайский район (Russian)
- District
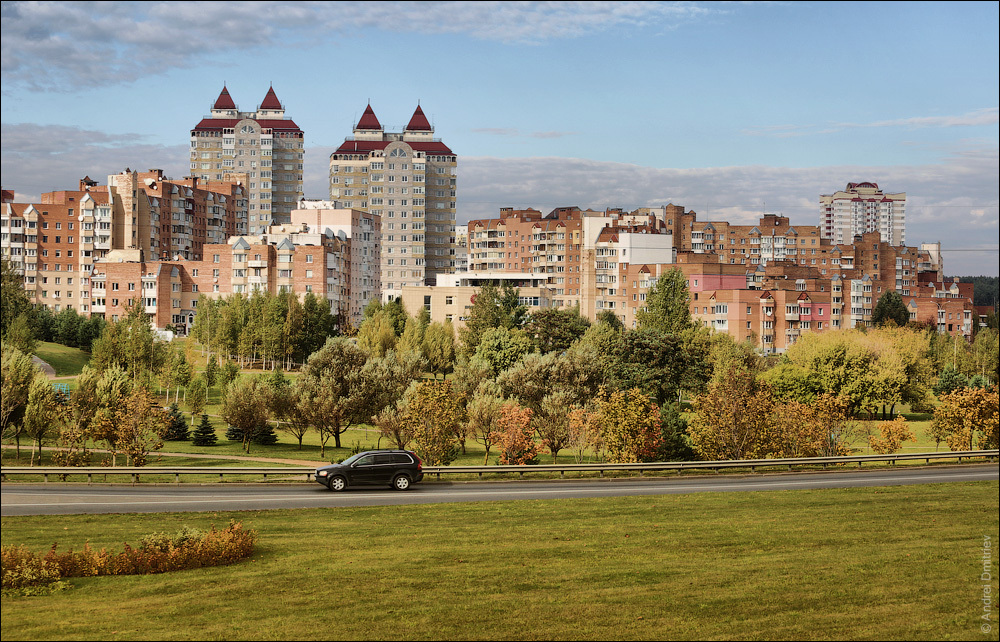

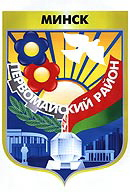
- Coat of arms

- Coordinates: 53.9510°N 27.5102°E
- Country: Belarus
- Municipality: Minsk

Area
  - Total: 26.4 km^{2} (10.2 sq mi)

Population (2023)
  - Total: 231,906
  - Density: 8,780/km^{2} (22,800/sq mi)
- District number: 3
- Website: Official website

Pyershamayski District or Pieršamajski District (Belarusian: Першамайскі раён; Russian: Первомайский район) is an administrative division of the city of Minsk, the capital of Belarus. It was named after May Day, also known as International Workers' Day. As of 2023, it has a population of 231,906.

== Geography ==
The district is situated in the north-eastern area of the city and borders with Savyetski and Partyzanski districts.

== Main sights ==
The National Library of Belarus is located in the district. Its octagonal structure is present in the coat of arms. In Chelyuskinites Park the "Children's Railroad" is located.

== Transport ==
The district is served by the Maskoŭskaja subway line. It is also crossed by the MKAD beltway .
