= Tamara Alpeyeva =

Belarusian philosopher and culturologist

- Тамара Міхайлаўна Алпеева
- Born: Tamara Lameka; March 23, 1949; Lyepyel, Vitebsk Region, Byelorussian Soviet Socialist Republic
- Education: Belarusian State University
- Known for: social philosophy, cultural studies

Tamara Alpeyeva (Belarusian: Тамара Міхайлаўна Алпеева), née Tamara Lameka (Belarusian: Тамара Міхайлаўна Ламека); born on March 23, 1949) is a Belarusian philosopher, culturologist and rector. She is an academician of the International Personnel Academy.

== Biography ==
Alpeyeva was born in Lyepyel, Vitebsk Region, Byelorussian Soviet Socialist Republic. She is a Doctor of Philosophy (1993) and a professor (1996). In 1972 she graduated from Belarusian State University (BSU). In the same year she got a job at the Institute of Philosophy and Law of the National Academy of Sciences of Belarus. In 1976 she moved to teach at the Belarusian State University of Informatics and Radioelectronics (BSUIR).

She was the Vice-Rector of the International Humanitarian and Economic Institute (IHEI) starting in 2002. Since August 2004, she is the rector at IHEI.

Her research interests are social philosophy and cultural studies, social mythology, and religious studies, the theory and the methodology of education and upbringing.

== EU sanctions ==
On March 22, 2011, she was added to the list of people and organizations sanctioned in relation to human rights violations in Belarus as the rector of the International Humanitarian and Economic Institute (IHEI) responsible for the expulsion of students. In particular, sanctions were imposed for the expulsion of Vladimir Kumets, activist of the Tell the Truth campaign.

== Selected books ==
- Социальный миф как культурно-исторический феномен / Т. М. Алпеева. – 2‑е изд., доп. – Минск : Рекламэкспорт, 1994. – 254 с. — ISBN 5-8467-0016-9. / "Social Myth as a Cultural and Historical Phenomenon" (Minsk, 1994)
- Введение в культурологию : учеб. пособие / Т. М. Алпеева; Гуманитар.-экон. ин-т. – Минск : ВЕДЫ, 1997. – 88 с. – ISBN 978-985-6390-06-0. / "Introduction to Cultural Studies" (Minsk, 1997)
- Религия. Человек. Общество : учеб.-метод. комплекс / Т. М. Алпеева; Гуманитар.-экон. негос. ин-т. – 2-е изд. – Минск : ВЕДЫ, 1999. – 134 с. – ISBN 978-985-450-021-8. / "Religion. Man. Society" (Minsk, 1999)
- Философия культуры : монография / Т. М. Алпеева; Междунар. гуманитар. экон. ин-т. – Мн. : Веды, 2004. – 451 с. — ISBN 978-985-450-227-4. / "Philosophy of Culture" (Minsk, 2004)
- Жизнь. Любовь. Отечество : к 60-летию со дня рождения А. Н. Алпеева / Т. М. Алпеева, В. Г. Ференц, Л. Н. Сечко. — Минск : Веды, 2006. — 270 с. — ISBN 978-985-450-245-8. / "Life. Love. Fatherland: to the 60th Anniversary of the Birth of A. N. Alpeyev" (Minsk, 2006)
- Спасибо за боль и за радость, или Испытание жизнью / Т. М. Алпеева. – Минск : Четыре четверти, 2009. – 317 с. – ISBN 978-985-6856-56-6. / "Thank You for Pain and Joy, or Testing by Life" (Minsk, 2009)

== Literature ==
- АЛПЕ́ЕВА Тамара Міхайлаўна. Беларуская энцыклапедыя (in Belarusian). Vol. 18–1 (100000 экз ed.). Мн.: БелЭн. 2004. p. 332. ISBN 985-11-0295-4 – via Г. П. Пашкоў і інш.
- АЛПЕ́ЕВА Тамара Михайловна // Республика Беларусь: Энциклопедия: В 6 т. Vol. 2. Минск: «Беларуская Энцыклапедыя» имени Петруся Бровки. 2006. p. 83. ISBN 978-985-11-0371-9 – via Г. П. Пашков.
- Бялова, Т. У., ed. (2010). "АЛПЕ́ЕВА Тамара Міхайлаўна" [Culture of Belarus]. Культура Беларусі (encyclopedia) (in Belarusian). 1. Мінск: Беларуская Энцыклапедыя імя Петруся Броўкі: 119. ISBN 978-985-11-0496-9.
