= Sharshuny (agrotown) =

Agrotown in Minsk Region, Belarus

Sharshuny Шаршуны (Belarusian) Шершуны (Russian)
- Agrotown
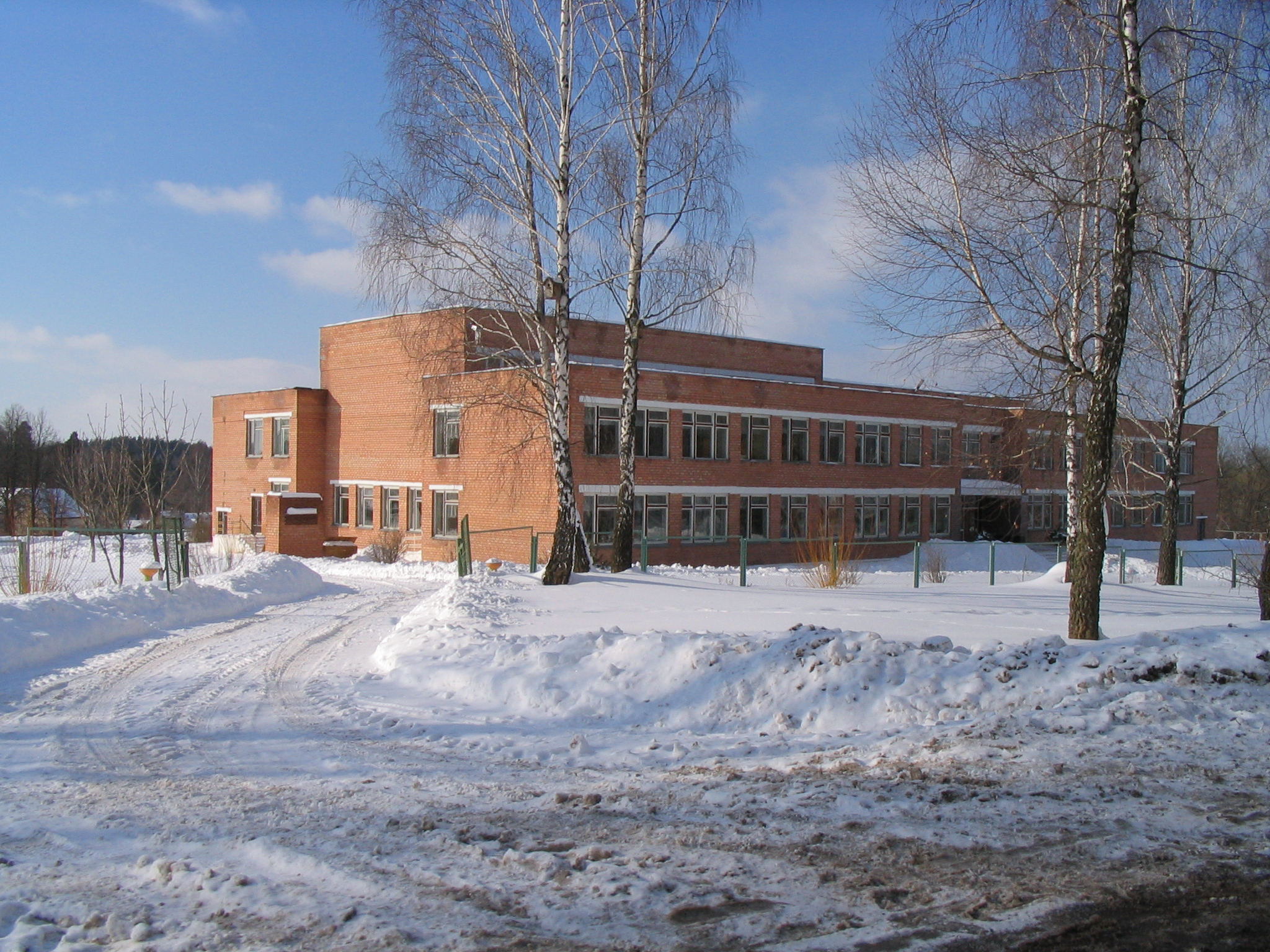

- Location within Belarus
- Coordinates: 54°10′55″N 27°21′38″E
- Country: Belarus
- Region: Minsk Region
- District: Minsk District

Population (2010)
  - Total: 525
- Time zone: UTC+3 (MSK)

Sharshuny (Belarusian: Шаршуны, romanized: Šaršuny; Russian: Шершуны, romanized: Shershuny) is an agrotown in Minsk District, Minsk Region, Belarus. It is administratively part of Sharshuny selsoviet; previously it was part of the former Rahava selsoviet. It is located two kilometres (1.2 mi) from the village of Sharshuny and 23 kilometres (14 mi) from the Minsk Ring Road, north of the capital Minsk. In 1997, it had a population of 502. In 2010, it had a population of 525.
