= Partyzanski District =

District of Minsk, Belarus

Partyzanski District Партызанскi раён (Belarusian) Партизанский район (Russian)
- District
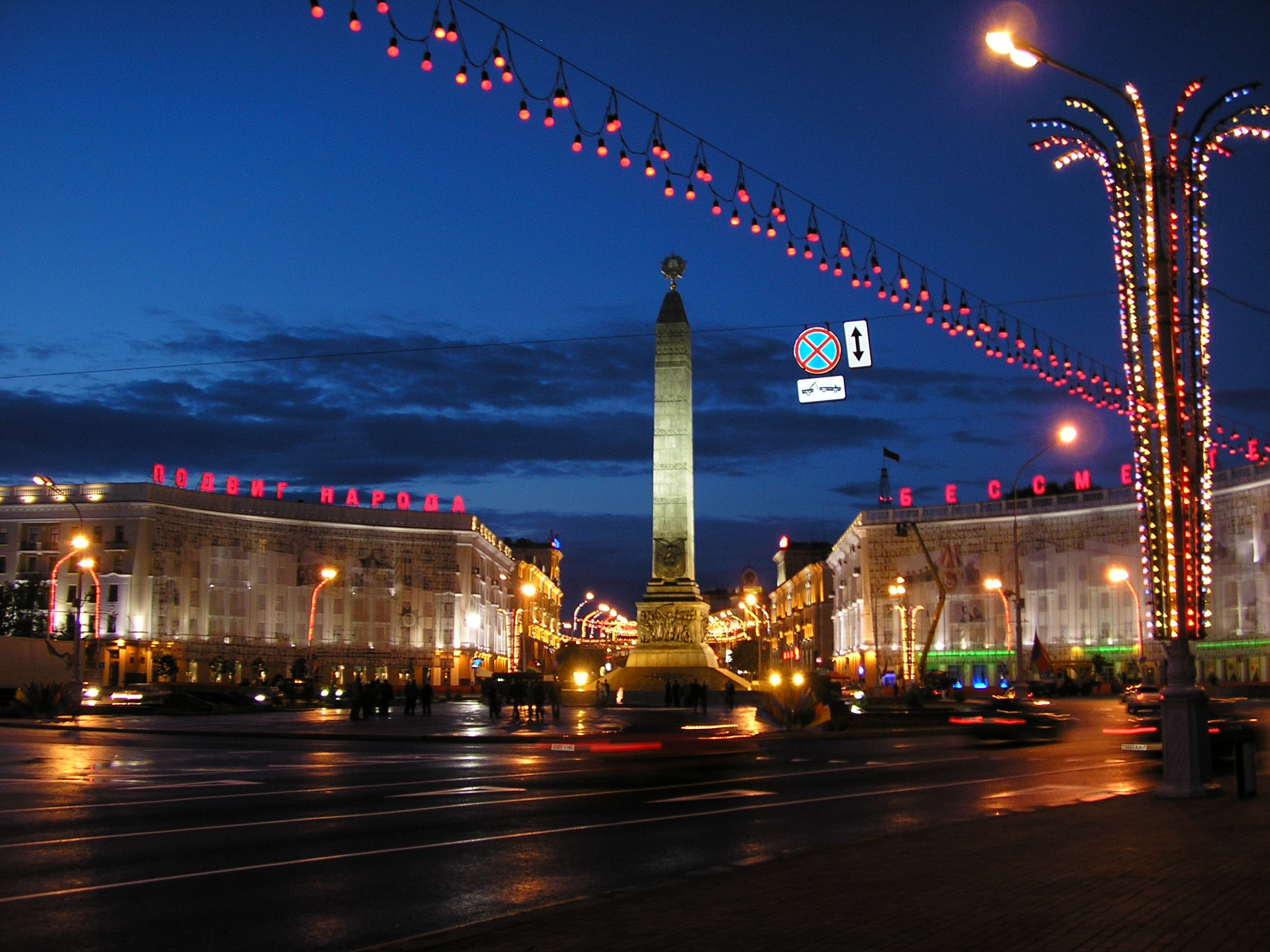
- Victory Square

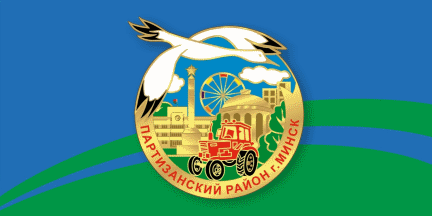
- Flag Coat of arms

- Coordinates: 53.9510°N 27.5102°E
- Country: Belarus
- Municipality: Minsk

Area
  - Total: 64.6 km^{2} (24.9 sq mi)

Population (2023)
  - Total: 94,143
  - Density: 1,460/km^{2} (3,770/sq mi)
- Website: Official website

Partyzanski District (Belarusian: Партызанскi раён; Russian: Партизанский район) is an administrative division of the city of Minsk, the capital of Belarus. It was named after the Soviet partisans and is the least populated district of the city. As of 2023, it has a population of 94,143.

== Geography ==
The district is situated in the central-eastern area of the city and borders Tsentralny, Savyetski, Pyershamayski, Zavodski and Leninsky districts.

== Transport ==
Partyzanski is served by the subway and tram networks. It is also crossed by the MKAD beltway .

== See also ==
- Victory Square
