= Savyetski District =

District of Minsk, Belarus

Savyetski District Савецкі раён (Belarusian) Советский район (Russian)
- District
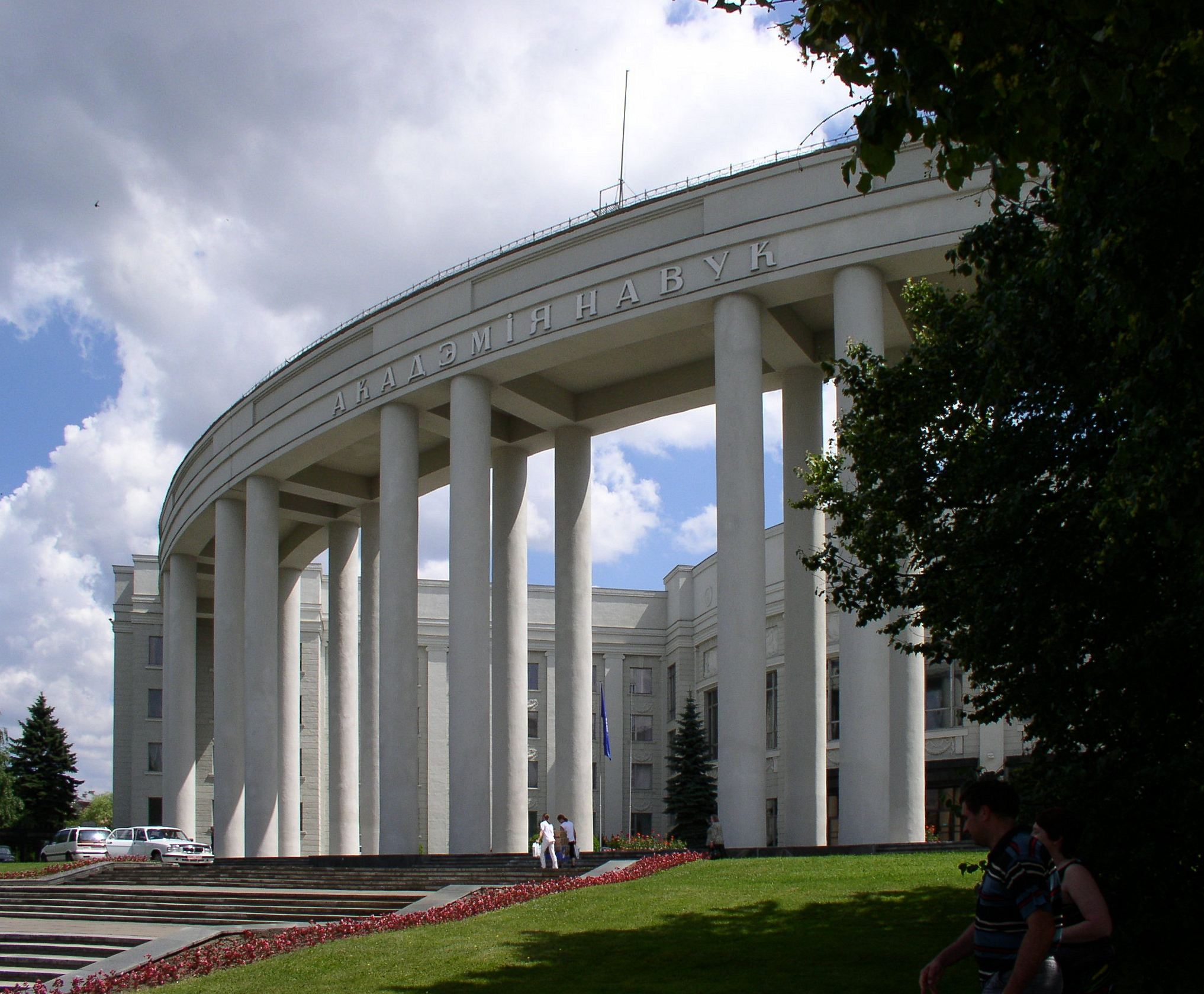
- National Academy of Sciences

- Coat of arms

- Coordinates: 53.9510°N 27.5102°E
- Country: Belarus
- Municipality: Minsk

Area
  - Total: 13 km^{2} (5.0 sq mi)

Population (2023)
  - Total: 156,739
  - Density: 12,000/km^{2} (31,000/sq mi)
- District number: 2
- Website: Official website

Savyetski District or Saviecki District (Belarusian: Савецкі раён; Russian: Советский район) is an administrative division of the city of Minsk, the capital of Belarus. It was named after the Soviets. As of 2023, it has a population of 156,739.

== Geography ==
The district, the smallest of the city, is situated in central and south-western area of the city and borders with Tsentralny, Pyershamayski and Partyzanski districts.

== Transport ==
The district is served by the Maskoŭskaja subway line. It is also crossed by the MKAD beltway.

== See also ==
- Opera and Ballet Theatre of Belarus
- National Academy of Sciences of Belarus
