= Frunzyenski District =

District of Minsk, Belarus

Frunzyenski District Фрунзенскі раён (Belarusian) Фрунзенский район (Russian)
- District
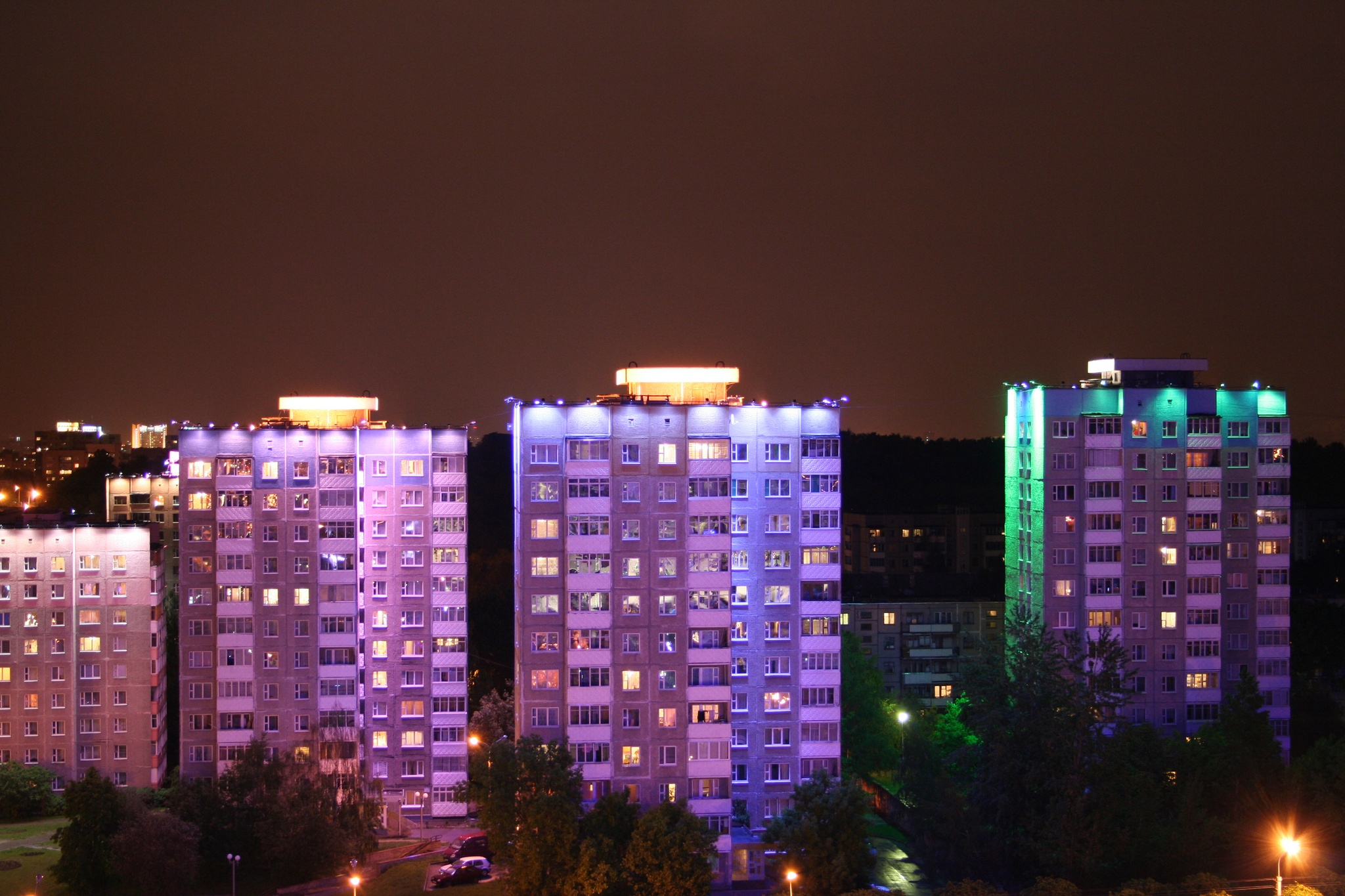
- Houses in south-east of Prytytski Square

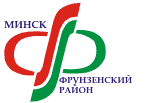
- Coat of arms

- Coordinates: 53.9510°N 27.5102°E
- Country: Belarus
- Municipality: Minsk

Area
  - Total: 43 km^{2} (17 sq mi)

Population (2023)
  - Total: 459,849
  - Density: 11,000/km^{2} (28,000/sq mi)
- District number: 9
- Website: Official website

Frunzyenski District or Frunzienski District (Belarusian: Фрунзенскі раён, romanized: Frunzienski rajon; Russian: Фрунзенский район, romanized: Frunzensky rayon) is an administrative division of the city of Minsk, the capital of Belarus. It was named after Mikhail Frunze and is the most populated district of the city. As of 2023, it has a population of 459,849.

== Geography ==
The district, the biggest in Minsk, is situated in the western area of the city and borders with Tsentralny and Maskowski districts.

It has several microdistricts, including Zapad, Zapad-4, etc.

== Transport ==
Frunzyenski is served by the Awtazavodskaya subway line. It is also crossed by the MKAD beltway.
