= Lyeninski District, Minsk =

District of Minsk, Belarus

Lyeninski District Ленінскі раён (Belarusian) Ленинский район (Russian)
- District
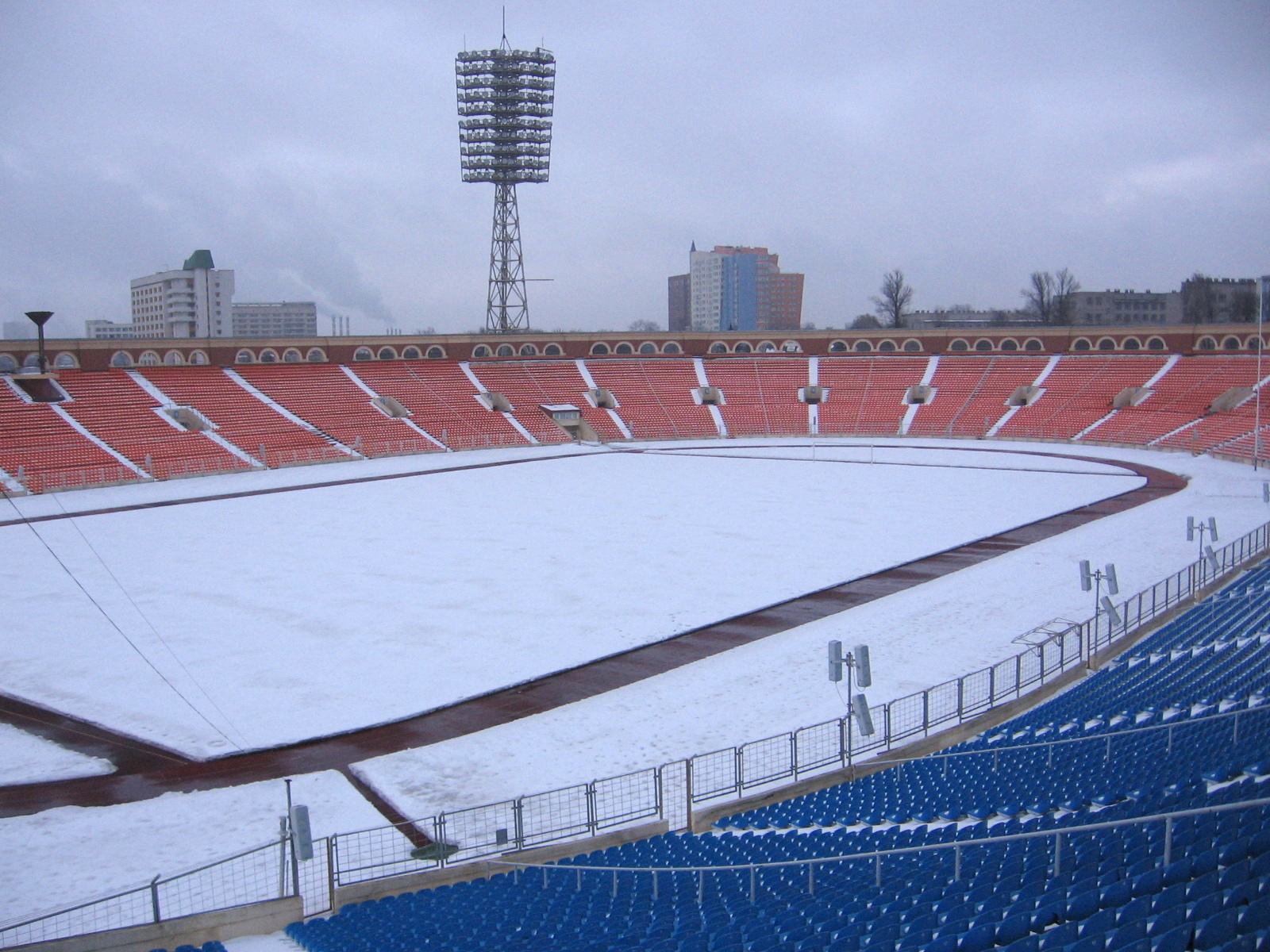
- Dinamo Stadium

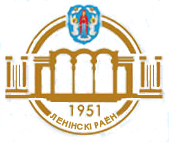
- Coat of arms

- Coordinates: 53.9510°N 27.5102°E
- Country: Belarus
- Municipality: Minsk

Area
  - Total: 26 km^{2} (10 sq mi)

Population (2023)
  - Total: 214,701
  - Density: 8,300/km^{2} (21,000/sq mi)
- District number: 6
- Website: Official website

Lyeninski District or Lieninski District (Belarusian: Ленінскі раён, romanized: Lieninski rajon; Russian: Ленинский район, romanized: Leninsky rayon) is an administrative division of the city of Minsk, the capital of Belarus. It was named after Vladimir Lenin. As of 2023, it has a population of 214,701.

== Geography ==
The district is situated in the south-central area of the city and borders with Tsentralny, Partyzanski, Zavodski, Kastrychnitski and Maskowski districts.

== Residential districts ==
- Syerabranka

== Transport ==
Lyeninski is served by subway and tram networks. It is also crossed by the MKAD beltway.

== See also ==
- Dinamo Stadium
