= Administrative divisions of Minsk =

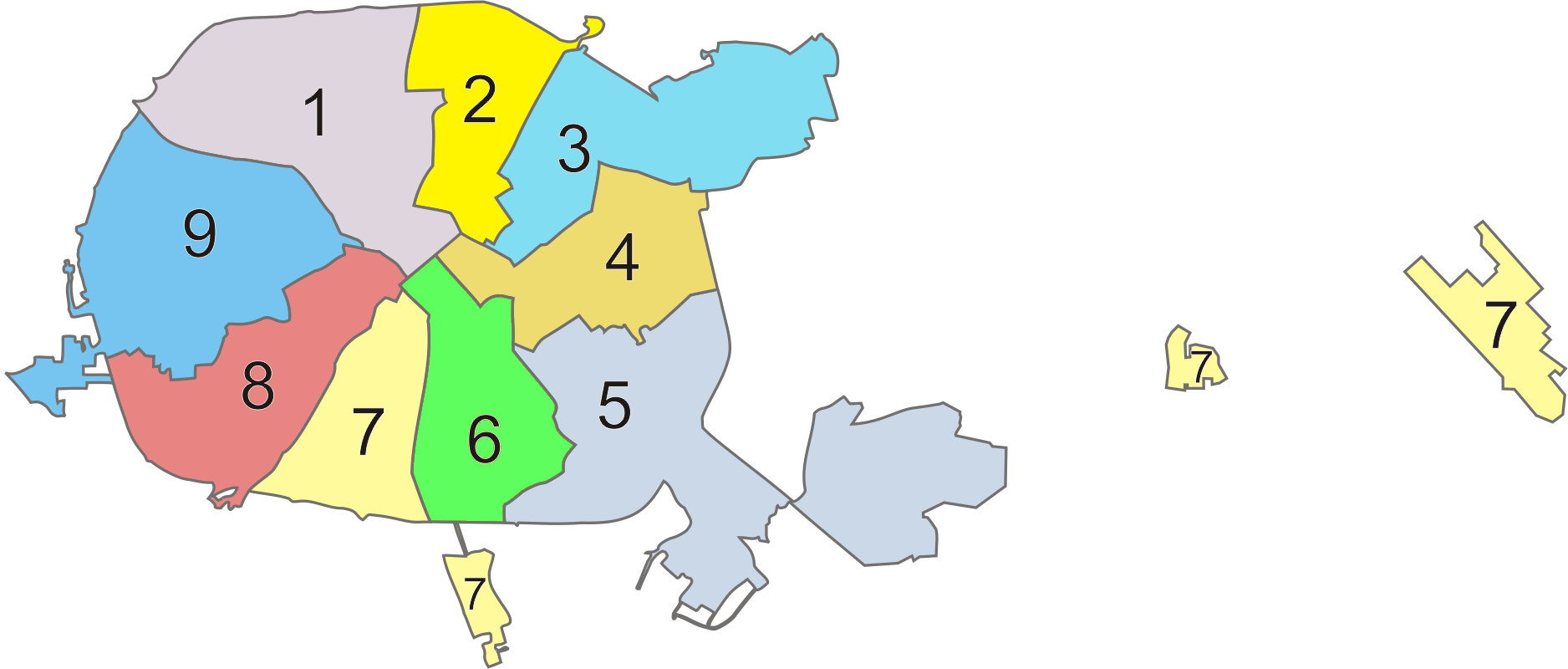
Districts of Minsk

Minsk, the capital of Belarus, is divided into nine districts (raions):

1. Tsentralny (Belarusian: Цэнтральны, Russian: Центральный), or "Central District"
2. Savyetski (Belarusian: Савецкі, Russian: Советский, Sovetsky), or "Soviet District
3. Pyershamayski (Belarusian: Першамайскі, Russian: Первомайский, Pervomaysky), named after the 1st of May
4. Partyzanski (Belarusian: Партызанскі, Russian: Партизанский, Partizansky), named after the Soviet partisans
5. Zavodski (Belarusian: Заводскі, Russian: Заводской, Zavodskoy), or "Factory district" (initially it included major plants, Minsk Tractor Works (MTZ) and Minsk Automobile Plant (MAZ), later the Partyzanski District with MTZ was split off it)
6. Leninsky (Belarusian: Ленінскі, Russian: Ленинский, Leninsky), named after Lenin
7. Kastrychnitski (Belarusian: Кастрычніцкі, Russian: Октябрьский, Oktyabrsky), named after the October Revolution
8. Maskowski (Belarusian: Маскоўскі, Russian: Московский, Moskovsky), named after Moscow
9. Frunzyenski (Belarusian: Фрунзенскі, Russian: Фрунзенский, Frunzensky), named after Mikhail Frunze

== History ==
The first subdivision of Minsk was carried out in August 1921: the Central Committee of the Communist Party of Belarus divided Minsk into three party administration districts: Aleksandrovsky (Александровский), Lyakhovsky (Ляховский), and Central (Центральный).

By the decree of the Central Executive Committee of Byelorussian SSR of March 17, 1938, Minsk was divided into three raions for general administration:

- Stalinski, i.e., Stalin district, renamed into Zavodzki (Factory/Plant district, after major tractor and automobile plants located there) in 1961
- Varashylauski, i.e., Voroshilov district, renamed into Savetski (Soviet district) in 1961
- Kahanovichski, i.e., Kaganovich district.

On July 20, 1957, the Kaganovich district was renamed into Oktyabrski (October district). On November 2, 1961, the Stalin district was renamed to the Factory district and the Voroshilov district into the Soviet district.

== Coats of arms of the districts ==
Except for Maskowski, each district has got its coat of arms. 7 of them have their name written in Russian, Savyetski in Belarusian.

Tsentralny

Savyetski

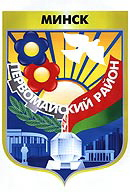
Pyershamayski

Partyzanski

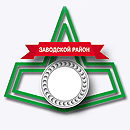
Zavodski

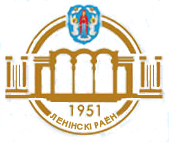
Leninsky

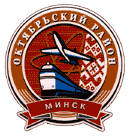
Kastrychnitski

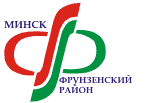
Frunzyenski

== Microraions ==
There are also microraions, areas of housing development outside the historical centre, primarily residential areas. Many of them are named after the suburban villages swallowed by the city. Others are named after the major streets.

- Aeradromnaya
- Akademharadok
- Anharskaya
- Azyaryshcha
- Chyrvony Bor
- Chyzhouka
- Drazdy
- Drazhnya
- Kharkauskaya
- Kuntsaushchyna
- Kurasoushchyna
- Loshytsa
- Malinauka
- Maly Trastsyanets
- Masyukoushchyna
- Paudnyovy Zahad
- Paunochny Pasyolak
- Sierabranka
- Shabany
- Sokal
- Sosny
- Stsypyanka
- Sukharava
- Syarova
- Uruchcha
- Uskhod
- Uskhodni
- Vyalikaya Slyapyanka
- Vyasnyanka
- Zahad
- Zyalyony Luh

== See also ==
- Arrondissement: equivalent type of municipal division in French-speaking countries and territories
