= Zavodski District =

District of Minsk, Belarus

Zavodski District Заводскі раён (Belarusian) Заводской район (Russian)
- District
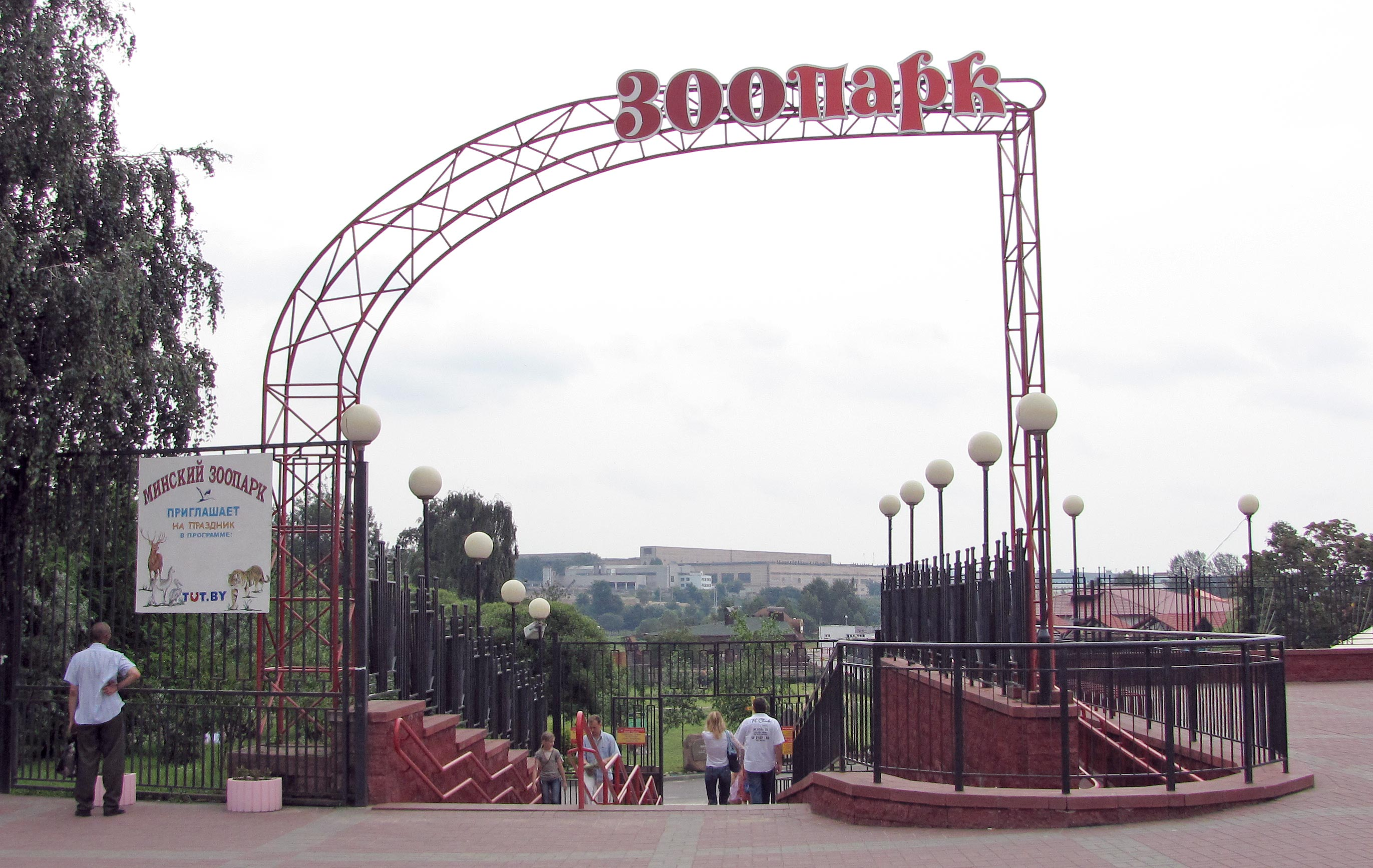
- Minsk Zoo entrance

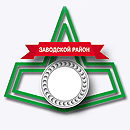
- Coat of arms

- Coordinates: 53.9510°N 27.5102°E
- Country: Belarus
- Municipality: Minsk

Area
  - Total: 36 km^{2} (14 sq mi)

Population (2023)
  - Total: 230,701
  - Density: 6,400/km^{2} (17,000/sq mi)
- District number: 5
- Website: Official website

Zavodski District (Belarusian: Заводскі раён, romanized: Zavodski rajon; Russian: Заводской район, romanized: Zavodskoy rayon) is an administrative division of the city of Minsk, the capital of Belarus. As of 2023, it has a population of 230,701.

It was formed in 1938 as Stalinsky District (Russian: Сталинский район, lit. 'Stalin District'); it was renamed in 1961 as Zavodskoy District (lit. 'Factory District') after the plants "Minsk Tractor Works" (MTZ) and "Minsk Automobile Plant" (MAZ) were constructed. The current borders of the district was approved on 10 November 1997 when the township "Sosny" was officially added to it.

== Geography ==
The district is situated in the south-eastern area of the city and borders with Partyzanski and Leninsky districts. Maly Trostenets extermination camp was located within Zavodski district.

== Transport ==
Zavodski is served by the tram line and by the Awtazavodskaya subway line. It is also crossed by the MKAD beltway.

== See also ==
- Minsk Zoo
- Maly Trostenets
