= Maskowski District =

District of Minsk, Belarus

Maskowski District Маскоўскі раён (Belarusian) Московский район (Russian)
- District
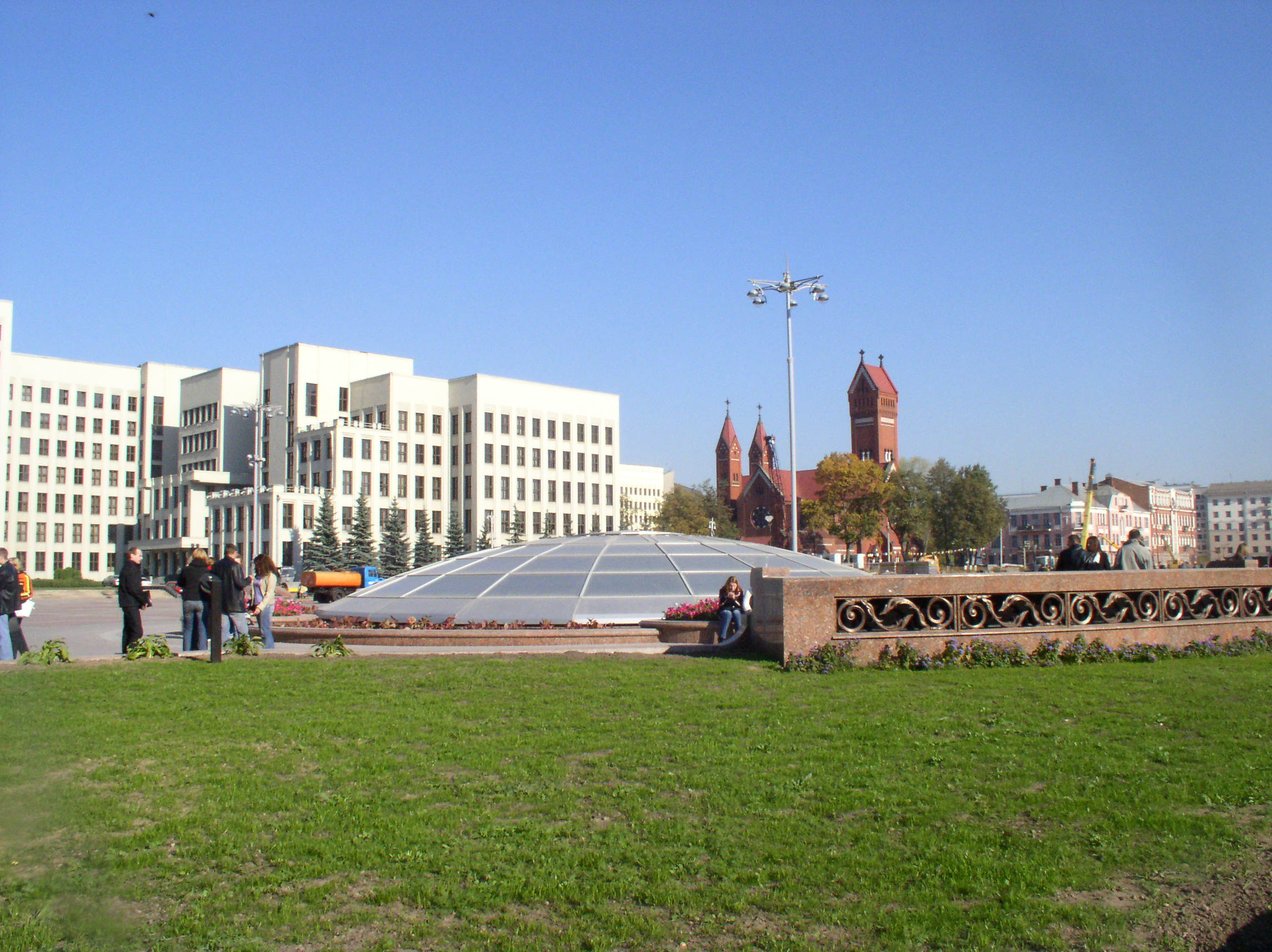
- Independence Square

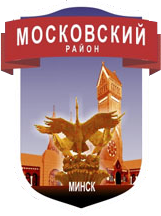
- Coat of arms

- Coordinates: 53.9510°N 27.5102°E
- Country: Belarus
- Municipality: Minsk

Area
  - Total: 30 km^{2} (12 sq mi)

Population (2023)
  - Total: 308,754
  - Density: 10,000/km^{2} (27,000/sq mi)
- District number: 8
- Website: Official website

Maskowski District or Maskoŭski District (Belarusian: Маскоўскі раён, romanized: Maskowski rajon; Russian: Московский район, romanized: Moskovsky rayon) is an administrative division of the city of Minsk, the capital of Belarus. It was named after the city of Moscow. As of 2023, it has a population of 308,754.

== Geography ==
The district is situated in central and south-western area of the city and borders with Frunzyenski, Tsentralny, Leninsky and Kastrychnitski districts.

== Transport ==
Maskowski is served by the subway and tram networks. It is also crossed by the MKAD beltway.

== See also ==
- Independence Square, Minsk
