= MKAD (Minsk) =

Major road in Belarus

M9
- Мінская кальцавая аўтамабільная дарога, МКАД

Route information
- Length: 56 km (35 mi)

Location
- Country: Belarus
- Major cities: Minsk

Highway system
- Roads in Belarus

The Minsk Automobile Ring Road (Belarusian: Мінская кальцавая аўтамабільная дарога; Russian: Минская кольцевая автомобильная дорога), also known as Minsk Ring Road or MKAD (МКАД), is the name of the beltway that goes around Minsk, Belarus. The 56.2 kilometres (34.9 mi) road straddles the Minsk city limits.

== History ==
=== Early history ===
The road was built between 1956 and 1963. In the beginning the road had just one lane in each direction and the width of the roadway was 7.5 meters. Reconstruction began in 1980. The result was 26.8 km with four lanes with the remaining section, 29.4 km, having two lanes.

=== Recent developments and current conditions ===
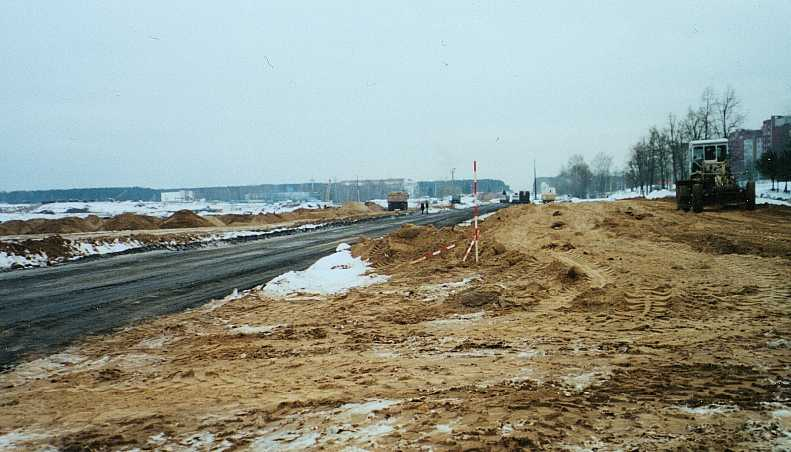
Road reconstruction in Kurapaty.

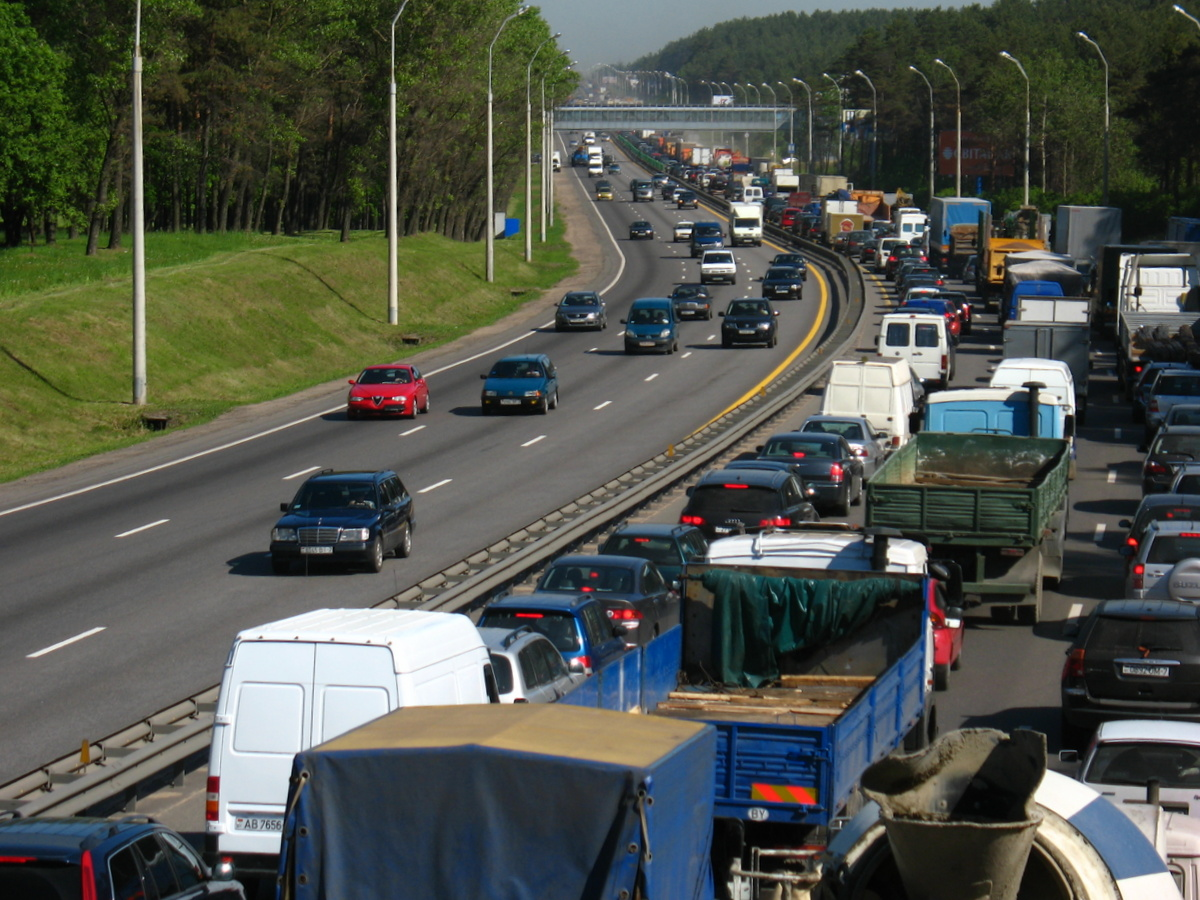
MKAD in May 2012

At the end of the 1990s, the road was used by 16,000-18,000 automobiles daily and had level crossings, traffic lights and bus stops. Thus, on 7 August 2001, President Alexander Lukashenko ordered its reconstruction, with the completion due by November 2002.

The decision was met with controversy as the route passed through Kurapaty, north of Minsk, site of a mass grave of victims of the Soviet secret police, the NKVD, during the Great Purge of 1937-1941. Estimates of those murdered there range into the hundreds of thousands, but the site has not been properly investigated or bodies exhumed. Protesters accused Lukashenko, who does not recognize the Kurapaty case and never mentions it in public, of planning to destroy the site and build over the graves of its victims in a deliberate attempt to cover over a Soviet crime against humanity. In 2001, protesters from the Belarusian Popular Front, Zubr and smaller organizations, occupied the site and sat out a bitter winter in tents. Despite international attention, they were unable to stop the construction.

The rebuilt road opened on 7 November 2002. MKAD has come closer to resembling a freeway, due to the elimination of traffic lights, the prohibition of left turns at grade level, and the installation of streetlights along its entire route. It has a total of six lanes, a width of 29 meters, and a capacity of 85,000 vehicles per day. The road was designed to have a 120 km/h speed limit, though at present the limit is 90 km/h. This restriction is due to frequent accidents involving people crossing in undesignated places, despite the fact that there are more than 50 pedestrian crossings and barriers on both sides of the road designed to prevent pedestrian intrusion.

There are three weight stations along the road. The roadway has implanted devices that measure surface condition, dewpoint, wind speed and direction, visibility, air temperature and other parameters. This information is transmitted to the central office, where officials can decide whether to treat the road surface to prevent it from freezing. The devices also measure the speed and frequency of road traffic. There are also electronic signboards with information for motorists.

Reconstruction required the laying of 680 tons of asphalt concrete, the installation of 100 km of pedestrian barrier and 2.4 km of sound barrier, and the construction of 24 interchanges, 30 bridges and viaducts, 6 above-ground pedestrian crossings and 16 underground pedestrian crossings.

As of 2006, the road was used by 50,000 vehicles a day. 93.4% of the vehicles were cars and vans, 5.8% were trucks and 0.8% were buses. Actual speeds were as follows:

- below 70 km/h: 13.3% of vehicles
- between 70 and 90 km/h: 53.4%
- above 90 km/h: 33.3%
